= Michael Nobel =

Swedish entrepreneur of Russian origin (1940-2024)

Michael Nobel (/noʊˈbɛl/ noh-BEL, Swedish: [nʊˈbɛlː]; 3 February 1940 – 27 November 2024) was a Swedish entrepreneur of Russian origin. He was a member of the Nobel family, a descendant of Ludvig Nobel, a chairman of the Nobel Family Society (1995–2006), a co-founder and chairman of the Nobel Sustainability Trust. Nobel served on several international boards that focus on scientific, medical and charitable initiatives. He promoted energy efficiency and alternative energy technology.

== Early life ==
A member of the Nobel-Oleinikoff branch of the Nobel family, Michael Nobel was the grandson of Marta Helena Nobel-Oleinikoff (née Nobel) and the great-grandson of industrialist and humanitarian Ludvig Nobel, the founder of Branobel and one of the world's richest men in his time. Ludvig was also the brother of Alfred Nobel, who invented dynamite and established five prizes in the family name.

Michael Nobel had a lengthy educational background which began at Harvard Business School in Cambridge, Massachusetts. In 1967, Nobel completed his studies at the Graduate Institute of Communications in Stockholm. Years later, in 1979, Nobel obtained a doctorate in psycho-pedagogy at the University of Lausanne. His thesis evaluated the effectiveness of substance abuse prevention programs in Switzerland

== Career ==
Nobel was a consultant on energy issues and gave regular keynote lectures on the subject. Also he was Chairman of the Nobel Sustainability Trust Foundation.

=== Board memberships ===
Nobel was the chairman or board member of twelve international companies in diagnostics, treatment and information in the field of medicine, most notably as chairman on the Board of Directors, Governors or Scientific Advisors. Nobel also served on several not-for-profit organizations in youth education and development as well as founder and trustee of the Nobel Sustainability Trust Foundation- an organization that bestows scholarships, awards for sustainable energy discoveries and organizes conferences and symposiums in the same field.

== Work history ==
=== MRI ===
In 1980, Nobel participated in the introduction of MRI, a field he worked in for 24 years. Magnetic resonance imaging (MRI) is a technique used in diagnostic imaging to create a detailed visual of internal structures. It provides contrast between the different soft tissues of the body making it especially useful in brain, muscles, heart, and cancer research.

=== Social medicine ===
Nobel has been a consultant to UNESCO in Paris and the United Nations' Social Affairs Division in Geneva. He also worked for seven years as a researcher in social sciences at the Institute for Mass Communication at the University of Lausanne and at the Department of Social Psychiatry at the Institute of Social and Preventive Medicine in the field of primary drug abuse prevention.

== Honors and awards ==
Nobel was awarded the Gusi Peace Prize in 2010, an honor dedicated to "Excellence and distinction to individuals or groups worldwide who have distinguished themselves as brilliant exemplars of society or who contributed toward the attainment of peace and respect for human life and dignity."
