= Bnito =

Oil company

Bnito (Russian: Батумское нефтепромышленное и торговое общество, romanized: Batumskoye Neftepromyshlennoye i Torgovoye Obschestvo), or the Caspian and Black Sea Oil Company, was an oil business founded in 1883 by Alphonse Rothschild of the Rothschild banking family of France.

== Context ==
By the early 1880s Russian crude oil production had increased to about 10.8 million barrels a year, about a third of American petroleum production at the time. The trade in that period was dominated by the Swedish Nobel Family, pioneered by Robert Nobel and Ludvig Nobel. The Nobels focused on a Northern route, sending oil from Baku north towards the Russian Heartlands and from there exporting through the Baltic Sea.

In an attempt to break the Nobel's hold over Russian crude, a pair of minor Russian businessmen, Palashnikov and Bunge, approached the French branch of the Rothschild family to finance a railway line from Baku, in Azerbaijan, to the Black Sea port of Batumi. Mayer (Alphonse) de Rothschild secured the operation and received a package of mortgages on Russian oil production facilities along with favorable offtake agreements for the transportation of crude into Western Europe. Seeing that Russian oil exports could be more competitive than US oil exports, the Rothschilds bought Bnito, and turned it into the Société Commerciale et Industrielle de Naphte Caspienne et de la mer Noire (The Caspian and Black Sea Oil Company). Other Russian oil companies were purchased by the Rothschild and the Deutsche Bank to consolidate the Russian oil market. The company pioneered carrying oil in tankers instead of wooden barrels and iron bidons.

By the turn of the century, the Caspian and Black Sea Oil Company started to compete with Standard Oil for international exports.

In 1912, the company was acquired by Royal Dutch Shell. The Rothschilds became shareholders of the latter.

== See also ==
- Black Sea energy
