= Emanuel Nobel =

Swedish oil baron (1859–1932)

His Excellency Emanuel Ludvig Nobel
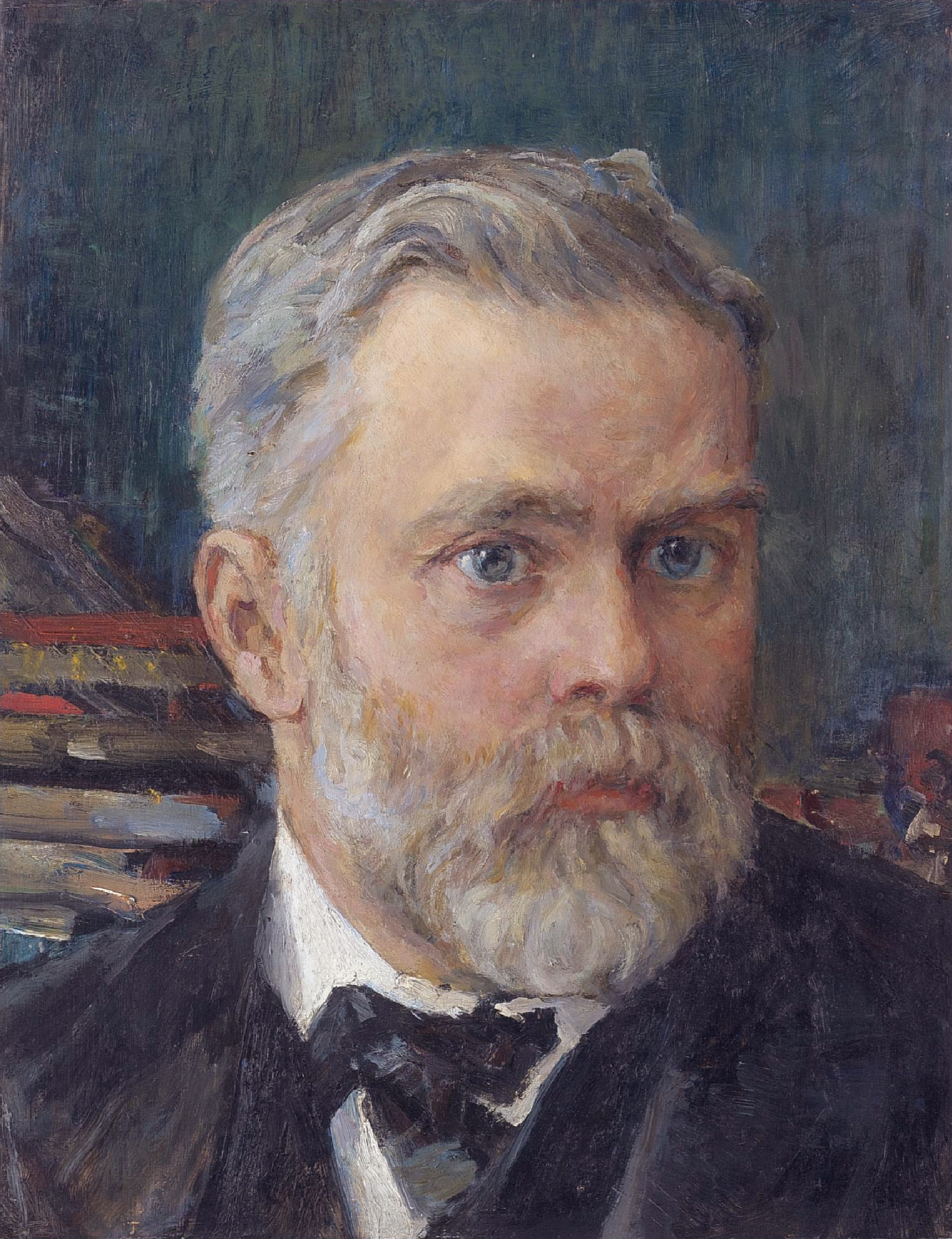
- Portrait by Valentin Serov, 1909
- Born: June 22, 1859; Saint Petersburg, Russia
- Died: May 31, 1932 (aged 72); Stockholm, Sweden
- Parents: Ludvig Nobel (father); Mina Ahlsell (mother)
- Family: Nobel family

Emanuel Ludvig Nobel (/noʊˈbɛl/ noh-BEL, Swedish: [nʊˈbɛlː]; Saint Petersburg, 22 June [O.S. 10 June] 1859 – Stockholm, 31 May 1932) was a Swedish oil baron, the eldest son of Ludvig Nobel and his first wife, Mina Ahlsell, grandson of Immanuel Nobel and nephew of Alfred Nobel.

== Businessman ==
After his father's death, in 1888, Emanuel Nobel took over the running of the Nobel family's oil business, Branobel, an oil empire that was based in Baku and was the largest oil company in Europe, of which he and his brothers and sisters were by far the main shareholders, followed by his uncles Alfred and Robert. Carl Nobel, Emanuel's brother, was put in charge of the Machine-Building Factory Ludvig Nobel.

Emanuel Nobel was a very forward-looking businessman, just like his father, who had instigated the construction of Russia's first pipeline and the world's first oil tanker in 1878, as well as the world's first railway tank cars in 1883. On 16 February 1898 Emanuel signed a licence agreement in Berlin with Rudolf Diesel, after having heard Diesel describing his new engine in a public lecture. The agreement allowed Nobel to build the world's first diesel engine plant in St Petersburg, and the engines were used to propel Branobel's fleet of oil tankers. Emanuel led Baku to a dominating role in the global oil industry and Branobel activities soon developed throughout the Caspian Sea, operating also in Grozny and Dosser.

In 1888, Emanuel was host to Tsar Alexander III and Maria Feodorovna (Dagmar of Denmark) in Baku and was then personally requested by the Tsar to accept Russian citizenship, which he graciously accepted. He was later raised by the Tsar to His Excellency. From 1891 until 1918, His Excellency Emanuel Nobel was also on the board of the Russian State Bank's Discount Committee. He was in charge of the company until he was forced to flee Russia due to the Russian Revolution in the Summer of 1918.

In 1904 in Baku was established the Russian Prize named after Emanuel Ludvigovich Nobel by Baku Branch of Imperial Russian Technical Society (devoted to 25th years anniversary of "BraNobel Co." in 1879). Prize was given four times (in 1909, 1910, 1911 and 1914 years).

In 1919, Emanuel Nobel invested in the engineering office of Boris Hagelin. In 1922, he invested in Swedish cryptography company Cryptograph, installing Hagelin as a manager.

== Emanuel's role in the execution of Alfred Nobel's will ==
After Alfred Nobel died, in 1896, and his will was disclosed, the heirs of his eldest brother, Robert, displeased by the fact that the major part of their uncle's estate was bequeathed to the creation of the Nobel Foundation and of the Nobel Prizes, started a legal action to invalidate it. Emanuel Nobel, however, as head of the younger branch of the family, played a fundamental role in supporting the execution of his uncle's wishes, pleading even before King Oscar II, and an agreement with Robert Nobel's heirs was reached in 1898, thus allowing the creation of the Nobel Prizes.

== Art collector ==
Like his father Ludvig, Emanuel Nobel was an enthusiastic art collector. The rooms of the Nobel family's residence in St. Petersburg and of its Summer residence, Kirjola, on the Karelian Isthmus, displayed one of the most important collections, after the Romanov Imperial Collection, of Fabergé's masterworks and of Russian painting. A considerable part of the collection kept in St. Petersburg was saved from the hands of the Bolsheviks as well as most of the art objects that furnished Kirjola, which was destroyed during the Winter War in 1940.

== Final years ==
The outcome of the Russian Revolution forced Emanuel to flee Russia in the Summer of 1918. After the seizure of the Nobel family's properties by the Bolsheviks, Emanuel gradually retreated from the direction of the family's businesses. He never married and died in 1932 in Sweden.
