= Peter von Bilderling =

Russian engineer (1844–1900)

Baron Peter von Bilderling
- Пётр Бильдерлинг
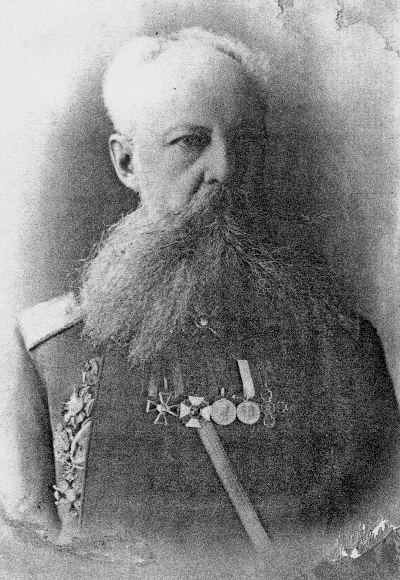
- Bilderling in 1890
- Born: May 26, 1844; Saint Petersburg, Russia
- Died: September 25, 1900 (aged 56); Zapolie, Russia
- Occupations: Engineer; officer

Baron Peter von Bilderling (Russian: Пётр Александрович Бильдерлинг; 26 May 1844 – 25 September 1900) was an engineer and an officer in the Engineering Corps of the Imperial Russian Army.

He was a humanist known for his writings, notably his book on the military horse, and his reorganisation of the Ijevsk arms factory, the manufacture of Berdanka carbines, and the creation of the no 4 line carbine. He founded the refinery in Tsaritsin with Robert Nobel and the Branobel oil company in Baku with Ludwig Nobel. Finally, he established an agricultural and meteorological station in Zapolie, where he invented the roséomètre, an instrument for measuring the dew point. He was the brother of Baron Alexandre von Bilderling, the general who participated in the Russo-Japanese War.

== Biography ==
Peter von Bilderling was born to a noble Baltic German family from the Duchy of Courland and Semigallia. His father, Alexandre Otto Hermann Grigoriévitch von Bilderling, was a lieutenant-general in the Engineering Corps. His grandfather, Georges Sigismond von Bilterlings, (1767–1829), was a Lutheran pastor in Mitau, Courland, today known as Jelgava, Latvia. He was a professor, theologian, philosopher and writer. His mother came from an untitled family of the Polish nobility, the Doliwo-Dobrowolski.

Peter von Bilderling was born in Saint Petersburg on May 26, 1844, and died the 25th of September 1900 at his Zapolie property near Louga, where he is buried. He left the Corps of Pages as a major with honors in 1861, then the Michel artillery academy in the first rank. He was attached to the Uhlan regiment of the guards of Grand Duke Nicholas Nikolaevich of Russia (1831–1891). He was an aide de camp to General Kartzof in the Caucasus. In 1870, he was sent on a mission by the Imperial government to Great Britain and the United States to study gun manufacture.

He married twice:

- Sofia Vladimirovna Westmann 1853–1914
- Natalia Alexandrovna Barantzov 1885–1981. Her descendants now live on the Côte d'Azur in Cannes and Nice.

== Ijevsk weapons factory ==
With an imperial government lease, he and Baron Standertskjöld, directed and reorganised the Ijevsk weapons factory from 1871 to 1879 to require only domestic raw materials. In 1872, he signed an agreement with Ludvig Nobel, who furnished the machine tools. Under his direction, more than 400,000 Berdanka guns were produced. He created the #4 line carbine. A telegraph office opened at the factory. The factory was re-supplied by rail. It was during these years (with production starting of the Berdan rifle) that the division of labour and machine tool production of gun mechanism components came into its own. The Kalashnikov was invented and manufactured at Ijevsk. The carbine #4 underwent a baptism of fire during the Russo-Turk War. Von Bilderling personally visited the front to evaluate of the effectiveness of this weapon. He was later awarded the right to bear the arms of St George for his actions on the Danube. Wounded in the leg and head, he joined the reserve corps in September 1880.

== Branobel, Baku oil company ==
Instead of using his time and the assets of his mission to find raw materials for the Ijevsk factory, in 1876 Robert Nobel used the 25,000 rubles he had to buy an oil refinery in Tsaritsyne, now known as Volgograd. He saw the refinery as an investment with a great future.

A total of 450,000 rubles were invested in Branobel. Peter von Bilderling put in 300,000 and Baron Standertskjöld 150,000. The business began to show a profit.

Ludwig Nobel convinced his older brother Robert in May 1879 to set up a company, the "Tovarichtchestvo Nephtanavo Proïsvodtsva Bratiev Nobel" (Nobel Brothers Oil Production Company), named Branobel in telegraph communications, and soon, simply NOBEL. Peter von Bilderling remained president of its administrative council until he died in 1900. The capital of the business founded in St Petersburg (3 million rubles in 600 shares of 5000 rubles each) was held as follows:

- Ludwig Nobel...........................1 610 000
- Baron Peter von Bilderling........930 000
- Alfred Nobel..........................115 000
- Robert Nobel...........................100 000
- I.J. Zabelsky..........................135 000
- Baron Alexandre von Bilderling.....50 000
- Fritz Blumberg..........................25 000
- Michel Beliamin.........................25 000
- A.S. Sundgren............................5 000
- Benno Wunderlich.........................5 000

This 3-million-ruble capitalization was followed by another million rubles in 1880, 2 million and 4 million in 1881 and finally 5 million in 1884 (in 250-rubles shares to allow investors to multiply). Branobel was, at the end of the 19th century, one of the biggest oil companies in the world. Pipeline technology for oil transportation was perfected near Baku by Vladimir Shukhov and Branobel in the years 1878–1880.

Of the money bequeathed by Alfred Nobel to establish the Nobel Prize, 12% came from his shares in Branobel. At that point he was its biggest individual investor. Bolsheviks took Baku on April 28, 1920, and nationalized Branobel.

== Agriculture, meteorology in Zapolie ==
Around 1881, after much searching in Courland, he bought from a property from General Borivoje Mirković, a property of 400 mas de Zapolie et de 490 mas de Boussany (Luga District, Saint-Petersburg). In 1889, he organised and became very interested in the model agricultural station in Zapolie with a special meteorology station, reputed even abroad. After completely organizing the work, he turned these stations over to the minister of agriculture.

== Family ==
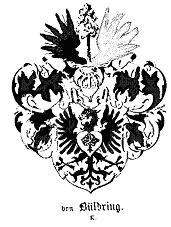
Armes Buldring Bilderling

Peter von Bilderling's family was originally from Westphalia. In 1350 Otbert Boldring owned the fiefs of Cotwik and Overdik in Raalte parish and were notable members of the Hanseatic League. One branch of the family came from the Baltic countries with Johan Buldrink, in Courland, who became the vassal of the Teutonic Order when he received a fief near Riga named Bilderlingshof from Wolter von Plettenberg, the grand master of the Order. Between the 17th century and 1940 (currently Bulduri). Hermann von Bilderling had his family entered in the Nobiliaire de Courlande in 1634 (first class) and is cited in the Baltic genealogical literature as Uradel (noblesse immémoriale). The branch of Peter von Bilderling came through Livonia with Friedrich, grandson of Johan, and the fiefs of Karrinem and Taifer, then Lithuania with Johan then Melchior and the fief of Miszany. The family's title of baron was recognized in the Russian Nobiliaire through an edict of the Imperial Senate in 1903.

The family arms are: D'argent à une aigle de sable, languée de gueules, la poitrine d'argent bearing a green poplar. Cimier un peuplier arraché de sinople entre un vol de sable à dextre et d'argent à sénestre. Sable lambrequins doublé d'argent.

The poplar is a reference to the original name, Boldring. (Bolder meant poplar in Old German. Dictionnaire de Grimm).

== Writings ==
- Encyclopédie du cheval
- Русская скорострельная винтовка. "L'armement rapide russe. "
- Тактика новейшего скорострельного оружия. "Tactique avec le nouvel armement rapide. "
- Приготовление стальных стволов в Америке. "La préparation des canons d'acier en Amérique"
- Удобрение в теории и на практике (St Petersburg, 1891). "Engrais dans la théorie et dans la pratique"
- Обзор современного состояния земледелия и сельскохозяйственного образования во Франции (St Petersburg, 1889) " Analyse de l'état de l'art de l'agriculture et de la formation agricole en France "
- Беседы по земледелию (Saint-Pétersbourg, 1897) "Forces of nature in agriculture"

== Bibliography ==
- "Бильдерлинг, Петр Александрович" . Brockhaus and Efron Encyclopedic Dictionary (in Russian). 1906.
- The Russian Rockefellers: the saga of the Nobel family and the Russian oil ... Par Robert W. Tolf
- Alfred Nobel : A biography by Par Kenne Fant, Marianne Ruuth
- Stamp issued by Azerbaidjan in 2003 commemorating oil in Baku
- Histoire des pétroles de Bakou
- Le roséomètre
