= Nobel Charitable Trust =

Charity

The Nobel Sustainability Trust (NST), formerly known as the Nobel Charitable Trust, is a charity set up by members of the Swedish Nobel family, i.e. descendants of the Ludvig Nobel. Its founders are Michael Nobel, Gustaf Nobel, and Philip Nobel. Its board consists of Peter Nobel, Michael Nobel, Erik Nobel, Stephanie Nobel, and Johan Nobel. The trust started to bestow awards in 2024. The selection of the awards is coordinated by the Institute for Advanced Study of the Technical University of Munich (TUM-IAS).

The former Chairman of the Nobel Sustainability Trust is Gustaf Nobel.

== Awards ==
The mission of the Nobel Sustainability Trust Foundation (NST) is to promote sustainable economic growth that preserves and ultimately enhances the living systems on the planet, creates opportunities for people, and harnesses human ingenuity in support of a prosperous common future.

=== 2024 ===
The awardees of the second edition of the Sustainability Award 2024 are

- Dr. Mathis Wackernagel for his contribution to the awareness of climate change and resource constraints through his work on the Ecological Footprint and Earth Overshoot Day,
- Prof. Klaus Butterbach-Bahl for his research work on quantifying greenhouse emissions and his studies on the biosphere-atmosphere exchange, and
- Prof. Jiuhui Qu for developing technologies to ensure safe drinking water in urban and rural areas serving millions of people.
- former UN Secretary-General Ban Ki-moon are the recipients of the Medal of Outstanding Contribution to Sustainability.
