= Peter Noble =

Peter Noble may refer to:

- Peter Noble (footballer) (1944–2017), British footballer
- Peter Noble (academic) (1899–1987), British academic
- Peter Noble (music promoter), Australian entrepreneur
- Fin (character), a fictional character

== See also ==
- Peter Nobel (born 1931), Swedish lawyer
