= Peter Nobel =

Swedish academic (1931–2026)

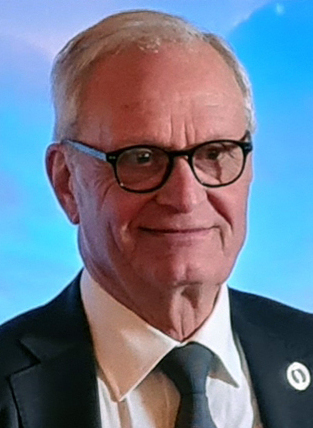

Peter Nobel (/noʊˈbɛl/ noh-BEL, Swedish: [nʊˈbɛlː]; 8 December 1931 – 26 May 2026) was a Swedish human rights lawyer and a member of the Nobel family, who served as Sweden's first Ombudsman for discrimination (1986–1991), Secretary General of the Swedish Red Cross (1991–94), and an expert for the UN Committee on the Elimination of Racial Discrimination (1998–2001).

== Life and career ==
Nobel was a great-grandson of the industrialist and humanitarian Ludvig Nobel, the founder of Branobel.

Like several other members of his family, among them Marta Helena Nobel-Oleinikoff, he was a fierce critic of the Nobel Memorial Prize in Economic Sciences, and what he and his family see as misuse of their family name by the awarding institution. He argued that no member of the Nobel family ever had the intention of creating an award in economics.

Nobel died on 26 May 2026, at the age of 94.

== Recognitions ==
- Honorary doctorate in law, Uppsala University
- Honorary member of Stockholms nation

== Publications ==
- Peter Nobel (2004). I idealisk riktning - Mitt liv. Atlantis
