= Nobelite =

Employees of the companies owned by the Nobel family

Nobelite was the common designation of the tens of thousands of employees of the companies owned by the Nobel family in Russia during the 19th century and until the Russian Revolution, such as Branobel and the Machine-Building Factory Ludvig Nobel.

The term originated from the pride and loyalty of Nobel family's employees, who enjoyed the benefits of a special worker's welfare program devised by Ludvig Nobel. Nobelite labor conditions were far different from those usually enjoyed by other Russian workers of the time and stood out as an unparelelled humanitarian concern in the Russian Empire. Nobelites were given decent housing, medical care, technical training and elementary education for their children. Ludvig Nobel also abolished child labour in his companies and shortened work hours while establishing a workers' savings bank and a system of regular payment.
