= Herstein =

Herstein is a surname. Notable people with the surname include:

- Adolf Eduard Herstein (1869–1932), Polish-born painter and engraver
- Bernice Herstein (1918–1950), American socialite
- Israel Nathan Herstein (1923–1988), Polish-born mathematician in Chicago
- Lillian Herstein (1886–1983), American labor organizer
- Ruth Herstein (1932–1999), American chess master

== Other uses ==
- MV Herstein (1938), a Danish freighter

== See also ==
- Holstein (disambiguation)
