= Holstein (disambiguation) =

Holstein may refer to:

== Animal breeds ==
- Holstein Friesian, a cattle breed used in dairy farming
- Holsteiner, a breed of horse originating in the Schleswig-Holstein region of northern Germany

== Places ==
- Schleswig-Holstein, a state in Northern Germany
- Holstein, a region in Germany
- Duchy of Holstein
- Holstein, Ontario, a village in Canada
- New Holstein, Wisconsin, United States
- Holstein, Iowa, United States
- Holstein, Missouri, United States
- Holstein, Nebraska, United States
- the German name of Pregolskiy, Kaliningrad, Russia
- Hölstein, a village in Basel-Landschaft, Switzerland

== Danish ships ==
n.b. In Danish, the spelling of Holstein can be varied as Holsten or Holsteen

- Holsten (I) – a ship of the Danish East India Company (1800–1805); originally HDMS Det Store Bælt (1782)
- Holsten (II) – a ship of the Danish East India Company (1806–1808); see Warren Hastings (1802 EIC ship)
- HDMS Holsteen, a Danish ship-of-the-line

== Other ==
- Holstein (station), an Oslo Metro station
- Holstein (surname)
- Holstein interglacial, a geologic stretch of time
- Holstein-Primakoff transformation, a mathematical physics transformation
- Pedro de Sousa Holstein, 1st Duke of Palmela (1781–1850), Portuguese diplomat and statesmen

== See also ==
- Holston (disambiguation)
