= Emil Oskar Nobel =

Swedish industrial worker (1843–1864)

Emil Nobel
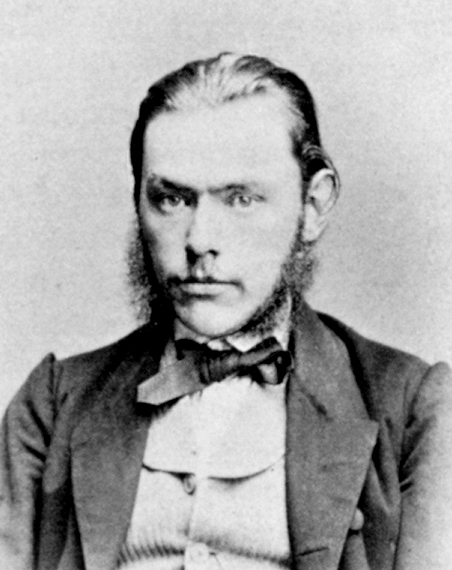
- Nobel in the 1860s
- Born: 29 October 1843; Saint Petersburg, Russia
- Died: 29 September 1864 (aged 20)
- Occupation: Chemist
- Parents: Immanuel Nobel (father); Andriette Nobel (mother)
- Relatives: Alfred Nobel (brother); Robert Nobel (brother); Ludvig Nobel (brother)
- Family: Nobel

Emil Oskar Nobel (/noʊˈbɛl/ noh-BEL, Swedish: [nʊˈbɛlː]; also known as Oscar; 29 October 1843 – 3 September 1864) was a member of the Nobel family.

== Biography ==
Emil Nobel was born in Saint Petersburg, Russia. He was the youngest son of Immanuel Nobel (1801–1872) and Karolina Andrietta Ahlsell (1803–1889). He was the brother of Robert Nobel, Ludvig Nobel and Alfred Nobel. In 1842, Immanuel Nobel opened a workshop with a foundry in St. Petersburg, returning to Sweden in 1859 with his youngest sons Emil and Alfred. Emil was the only member of the family to go to college, attending the University of Uppsala.

Emil died together with several other factory workers, the victim of an explosion while experimenting with nitroglycerine at Nobels Sprängolja, his father's factory at Heleneborg in Stockholm. At the time, Nobel was a student in Uppsala, but also helped in the factory. After the explosion, production of nitroglycerin was banned in the factory, but continued close to Heleneborg on an anchored barge in a bay of Lake Mälaren.

His brother Alfred was not in the factory at the time of Emil's death but later managed to stabilize dynamite with a diatomaceous earth called kieselguhr.

== Other sources ==
- Förfärlig olyckshändelse i Stockholm. Nya Dagligt Allehanda. 3 September 1864
- Gudrun Wolfschmidt (2009). Hamburgs Geschichte einmal anders: Entwicklung der Naturwissenschaften, Medizin und Technik. Books on Demand. p. 126. ISBN 978-3-8370-5329-6.
