= Gustaf Nobel =

Gustaf Nobel (/noʊˈbɛl/ noh-BEL, Swedish: [nʊˈbɛlː]; born 1950 in Stockholm) is a Swedish businessman and humanitarian, and a member of the Nobel family. He is the Chairman of the Nobel Charitable Trust (since 2010).

He studied at the University of Lund, and has worked in management positions in various companies in 15 countries around the world. Since 2005 he has lived in France. He is currently CEO of Conversus SARL, a company owned by the Nobel family. He is also involved in environmental issues and renewable energy.
