= Andriette Nobel =

Mother of Alfred Nobel (1803–1889)

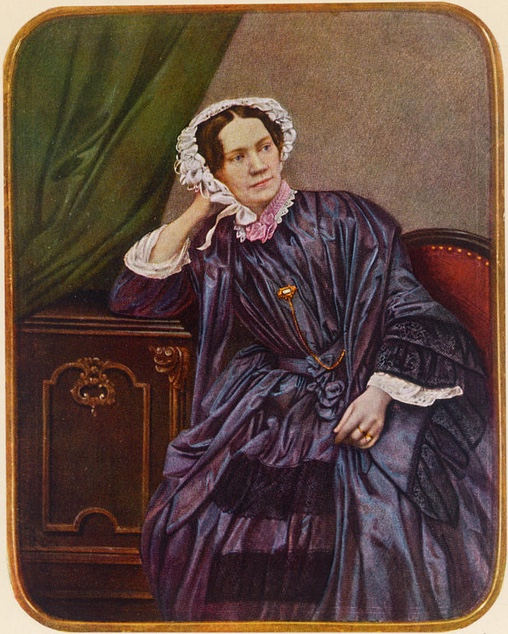
- Portrait, c. 1853
- Born: 30 September 1803
- Died: 7 December 1889 (aged 86)
- Spouse: Immanuel Nobel (m. 1827)
- Children: 8, including Robert, Ludvig, Alfred, and Emil
- Family: Nobel

Karolina Andriette Nobel (born Karolina Andriette Ahlsell; 30 September 1803 – 7 December 1889) was a Swedish woman and the mother of scientist Alfred Nobel.

== Life ==
Andriette was the daughter of Carolina Roospigg, and her father worked as a head clerk.

On 8 July 1827, she married Immanuel Nobel. The couple had a total of eight children, of whom Robert, Ludvig, Alfred, and Emil reached adulthood.

In 1828, Andriette and Immanuel rented an apartment in the suburbs of Stockholm; however, due to Immanuel's bankruptcy in 1833, the family had to move to another location in Stockholm. Immanuel later moved to Finland in 1837, then further east to Russia in 1838, while Andriette stayed in Stockholm. She later joined Immanuel in St. Petersburg in 1842, together with Ludvig and Alfred. During the years alone in Stockholm, she provided for the family by running a milk and vegetable shop.

She died on 7 December 1889.

== Sources ==
- Jangfeldt, Bengt (21 September 2023). The Nobel Family: Swedish Geniuses in Tsarist Russia. Bloomsbury Publishing. ISBN 978-1-350-34892-9.
