= Dynamite =

Explosive made using nitroglycerin

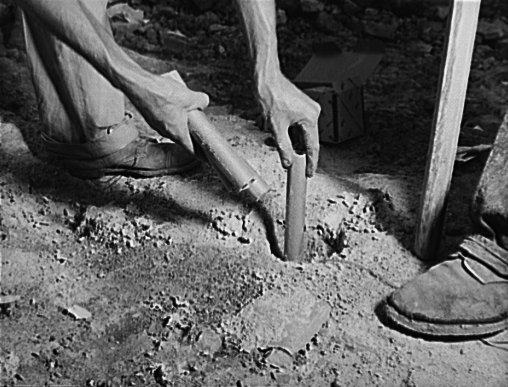
- Preparation of dynamite during the construction of the Douglas Dam, 1942
- Classification: Explosive
- Industry: Various
- Application: Explosion
- Inventor: Alfred Nobel
- Invented: 1866 (160 years ago)

Diagram: 1. Diatomaceous earth (or any other type of absorbent material) soaked in nitroglycerin.; 2. Protective coating surrounding the explosive material.; 3. Blasting cap.; 4. Electrical cable (or fuse) connected to the blasting cap.

Dynamite is an explosive made of nitroglycerin, sorbents (such as powdered shells or clay), and stabilizers. It was invented by Swedish chemist Alfred Nobel in 1866 and patented the following year.

Dynamite was the first safely manageable explosive stronger than traditional black powder–based explosives and was widely adopted as a safer and more robust alternative shortly after its introduction. It allows the use of nitroglycerin's favorable explosive properties while greatly reducing its risk of accidental detonation.

== History ==
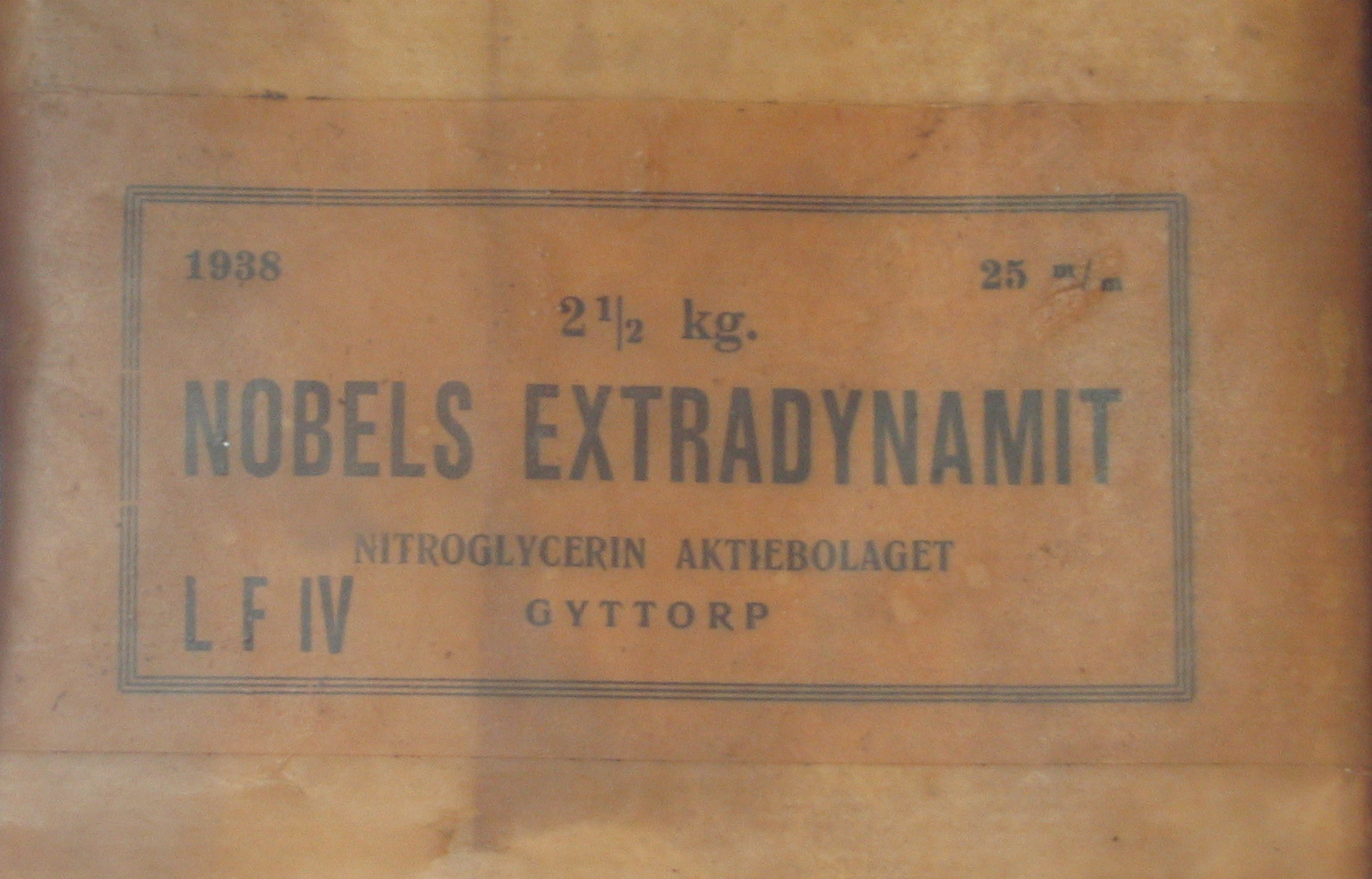
"Nobels extradynamit" manufactured by Nobel's old company, Nitroglycerin Aktiebolaget

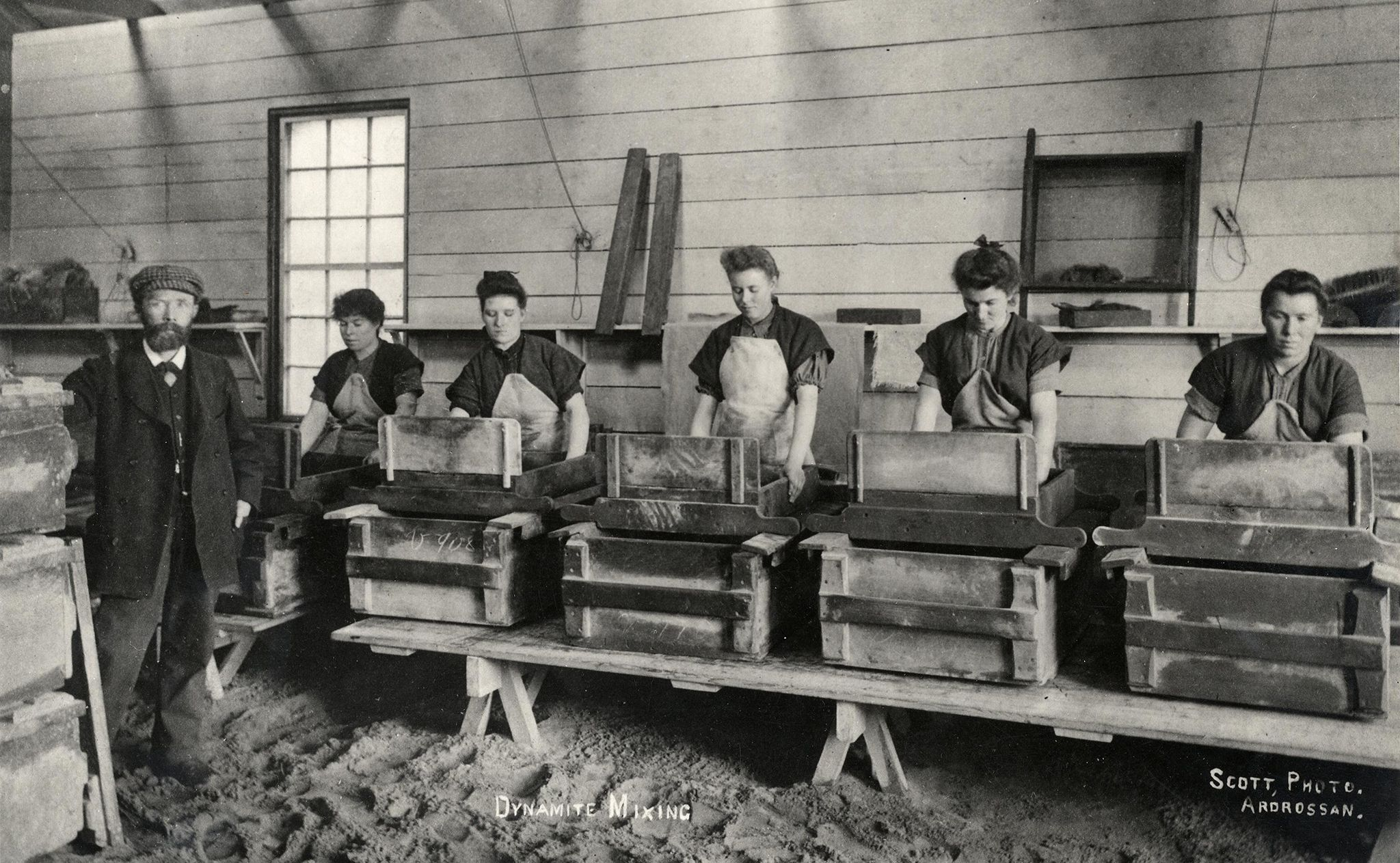
Women mixing dynamite at Nobel's Ardeer factory, 1897

Alfred Nobel's father, Immanuel Nobel, was an industrialist, engineer, and inventor. He built bridges and buildings in Stockholm and founded Sweden's first rubber factory. His construction work inspired him to research new methods of blasting rock that were more effective than black powder. After some bad business deals in Sweden, in 1838, Immanuel moved his family to Saint Petersburg, where Alfred and his brothers were educated privately under Swedish and Russian tutors. At the age of 17, Alfred Nobel was sent abroad for two years; in the United States he met Swedish engineer John Ericsson and in France studied under famed chemist Théophile-Jules Pelouze and his pupil Ascanio Sobrero, who had first synthesized nitroglycerin in 1847. Pelouze cautioned Nobel against using nitroglycerine as a commercial explosive because of its great sensitivity to shock.

In 1857, Nobel filed the first of several hundred patents, mostly concerning air pressure, gas, and fluid gauges, but remained fascinated with nitroglycerin's potential as an explosive. Nobel, along with his father, and brother Emil, experimented with various combinations of nitroglycerin and black powder. Nobel came up with a way to safely detonate nitroglycerin by inventing the detonator, or blasting cap, that allowed a controlled explosion to be set off from a distance using a fuse. In 1863, Nobel performed his first successful detonation of pure nitroglycerin, using a blasting cap made of a copper percussion cap and mercury fulminate. In 1864, Alfred Nobel filed patents for both the blasting cap and his method of synthesizing nitroglycerin, using sulfuric acid, nitric acid, and glycerin. On 3 September 1864, while experimenting with nitroglycerin, Emil and several others were killed in an explosion at the factory at Immanuel Nobel's estate at Heleneborg. After this, Alfred founded the company Nitroglycerin Aktiebolaget in Vinterviken to continue work in a more isolated area and the following year moved to Germany, where he founded another company, Dynamit Nobel.

Despite the invention of the blasting cap, the instability of nitroglycerin rendered it useless as a commercial explosive. To solve this problem, Nobel sought to combine it with another substance that would make it safe for transport and handling but would not reduce its effectiveness as an explosive. He tried combinations of cement, coal, and sawdust, but was unsuccessful. Finally, he tried diatomaceous earth, which is fossilized algae, that he brought from the Elbe River near his factory in Hamburg, which successfully stabilized the nitroglycerin into a portable explosive.

Nobel obtained patents for his inventions in England on 7 May 1867 and in Sweden on 19 October 1867. After its introduction, dynamite rapidly gained wide-scale use as a safe alternative to black powder and nitroglycerin. Nobel tightly controlled the patents, and unlicensed duplicating companies were quickly shut down. A few American businessmen got around the patent by using absorbents other than diatomaceous earth, such as resin.

Nobel originally intended to sell dynamite under the name "Nobel's Safety Powder", but later changed the name to dynamite, from the Ancient Greek word dýnamis (δύναμις), meaning "power".

== Manufacture ==
=== Form ===
Dynamite is usually sold in the form of cardboard cylinders about 200 mm (8 in) long and about 32 mm (1 1/4 in) in diameter, with a mass of about 190 grams (1/2 troy pound). A stick of dynamite thus produced contains roughly 1 MJ (megajoule) of energy. Other sizes also exist, rated by either portion (Quarter-Stick or Half-Stick) or by weight.

Dynamite is usually rated by "weight strength" (the amount of nitroglycerin it contains), usually from 20% to 60%. For example, 40% dynamite is composed of 40% nitroglycerin and 60% "dope" (the absorbent storage medium mixed with the stabilizer and any additives).

=== Storage considerations ===
The maximum shelf life of nitroglycerin-based dynamite is recommended as one year from the date of manufacture under good storage conditions.

Over time, regardless of the sorbent used, sticks of dynamite will "weep" or "sweat" nitroglycerin, which can then pool in the bottom of the box or storage area. For that reason, explosive manuals recommend the regular upending of boxes of dynamite in storage. Crystals will form on the outside of the sticks, purportedly causing them to be even more sensitive to shock, friction, and temperature. Modern packaging helps eliminate this by placing the dynamite into sealed plastic bags and using wax-coated cardboard.

Dynamite is moderately sensitive to shock. Shock resistance tests are usually carried out with a drop-hammer: about 100 mg of explosive is placed on an anvil, upon which a weight of between 0.5 and 10 kg (1 and 22 lb) is dropped from different heights until detonation is achieved. With a hammer of 2 kg, mercury fulminate detonates with a drop distance of 1 to 2 cm, nitroglycerin with 4 to 5 cm, dynamite with 15 to 30 cm, and ammoniacal explosives with 40 to 50 cm.

=== Major manufacturers ===
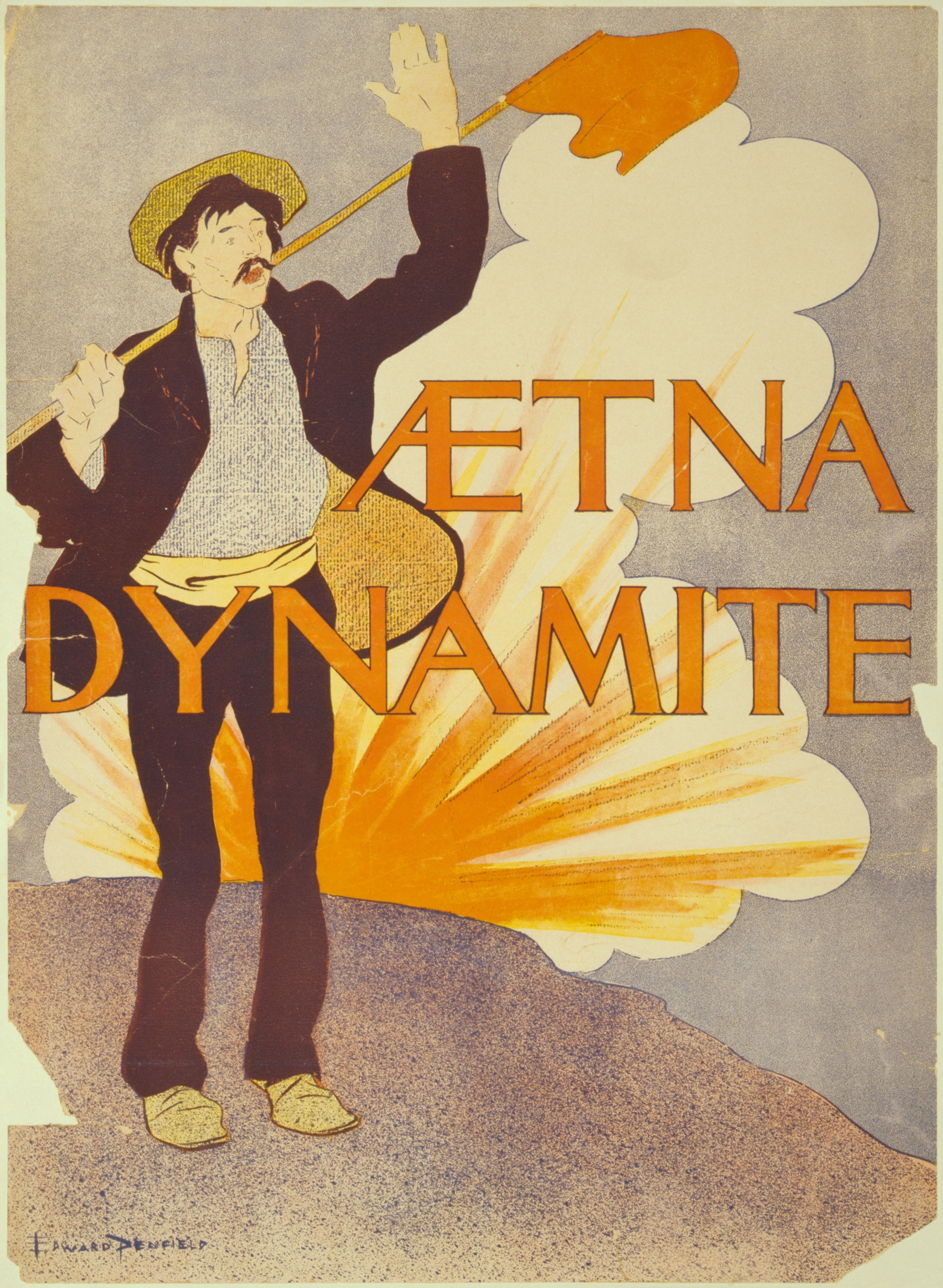
Advertisement for the Ætna Explosives Company of New York, artwork by Edward Penfield

==== South Africa ====
For several decades beginning in the 1940s, the largest producer of dynamite in the world was the Union of South Africa. There, the De Beers company established a factory in 1902 at Somerset West. The explosives factory was later operated by AECI (African Explosives and Chemical Industries). The demand for the product came mainly from the country's vast gold mines, centered on the Witwatersrand. The factory at Somerset West was in operation in 1903, and by 1907, it was already producing 340,000 cases, 23 kilograms (50 lb) each, annually. A rival factory at Modderfontein was producing another 200,000 cases per year.

There were two large explosions at the Somerset West plant during the 1960s. Some workers died, but the loss of life was limited by the modular design of the factory and its earthworks, and the planting of trees that directed the blasts upward. There were several other explosions at the Modderfontein factory. After 1985, pressure from trade unions forced AECI to phase out the production of dynamite. The factory then went on to produce ammonium nitrate emulsion-based explosives that are safer to manufacture and handle.

==== United States ====
Dynamite was first manufactured in the US by the Giant Powder Company of San Francisco, California, whose founder had obtained the exclusive rights from Nobel in 1867. Giant was eventually acquired by DuPont, which produced dynamite under the Giant name until Giant was dissolved by DuPont in 1905. Thereafter, DuPont produced dynamite under its own name until 1911–12, when its explosives monopoly was broken up by the U.S. Circuit Court in the "Powder Case". Two new companies were formed upon the breakup, the Hercules Powder Company and the Atlas Powder Company, which took up the manufacture of dynamite (in different formulations).

Currently, only Dyno Nobel manufactures dynamite in the US. The only facility producing it is located in Carthage, Missouri, but the material is purchased from Dyno Nobel by other manufacturers who put their labels on the dynamite and boxes.

== Non-dynamite explosives ==
Other explosives are often referred to or confused with dynamite:

=== Trinitrotoluene (TNT) ===
Trinitrotoluene (TNT) is often assumed to be the same as (or confused for) dynamite, largely because of the ubiquity of both explosives during the 20th century. This incorrect connection between TNT and dynamite was enhanced by cartoons such as Bugs Bunny, where animators labeled any kind of bomb (ranging from sticks of dynamite to kegs of black powder) as TNT, because the initialism was shorter and more memorable and did not require literacy to recognize that TNT meant "bomb".

Aside from both being high explosives, TNT and dynamite have little in common. TNT is a second-generation castable explosive adopted by the military, while dynamite, in contrast, has never been popular in warfare because it degenerates quickly under severe conditions and can be detonated by either fire or a wayward bullet. The German armed forces adopted TNT as a filling for artillery shells in 1902, some 40 years after the invention of dynamite. TNT has never been popular or widespread in civilian earthmoving, as it is more expensive and less powerful by weight than dynamite, as well as being slower to mix and pack into boreholes. TNT's primary asset is its remarkable insensitivity and stability: it is waterproof and incapable of detonating without the extreme shock and heat provided by a blasting cap (or a sympathetic detonation); this stability also allows it to be melted at 81 °C (178 °F), poured into high explosive shells and allowed to re-solidify, with no extra danger or change in the TNT's characteristics. More than 90% of the TNT produced in the United States was for the military market, with most TNT used for filling shells, hand grenades and aerial bombs, and the remainder being packaged in brown "bricks" (not red cylinders) for use as demolition charges by combat engineers.

=== "Extra" dynamite ===
In the United States, in 1885, the chemist Russell S. Penniman invented "ammonium dynamite", a form of explosive that used ammonium nitrate as a substitute for the more costly nitroglycerin. Ammonium nitrate has only 85% of the chemical energy of nitroglycerin.

It is rated by either "weight strength" (the amount of ammonium nitrate in the medium) or "cartridge strength" (the potential explosive strength generated by an amount of explosive of a certain density and grain size used in comparison to the explosive strength generated by an equivalent density and grain size of a standard explosive). For example, high-explosive 65% Extra dynamite has a weight strength of 65% ammonium nitrate and 35% "dope" (the absorbent medium mixed with the stabilizers and additives). Its "cartridge strength" would be its weight in pounds times its strength in relation to an equal amount of ANFO (the civilian baseline standard) or TNT (the military baseline standard). For example, 65% ammonium dynamite with a 20% cartridge strength would mean the stick was equal to an equivalent weight strength of 20% ANFO.

=== "Military dynamite" ===
"Military dynamite" (or M1 dynamite) is a dynamite substitute made with more stable ingredients than nitroglycerin. It contains 75% RDX, 15% TNT and 10% desensitizers and plasticizers. It has only 60% of the equivalent strength as commercial dynamite, but is much safer to store and handle.

== Regulation ==
Various countries around the world have enacted laws regarding explosives and require licenses to manufacture, distribute, store, use, and possess explosives or ingredients.

== See also ==
- Blast fishing
- Blasting machine
- Dynamite gun
- Nobel Prize
- Relative effectiveness factor
