= Immanuel Nobel =

Swedish architect, engineer, inventor, and industrialist (1801–1872)

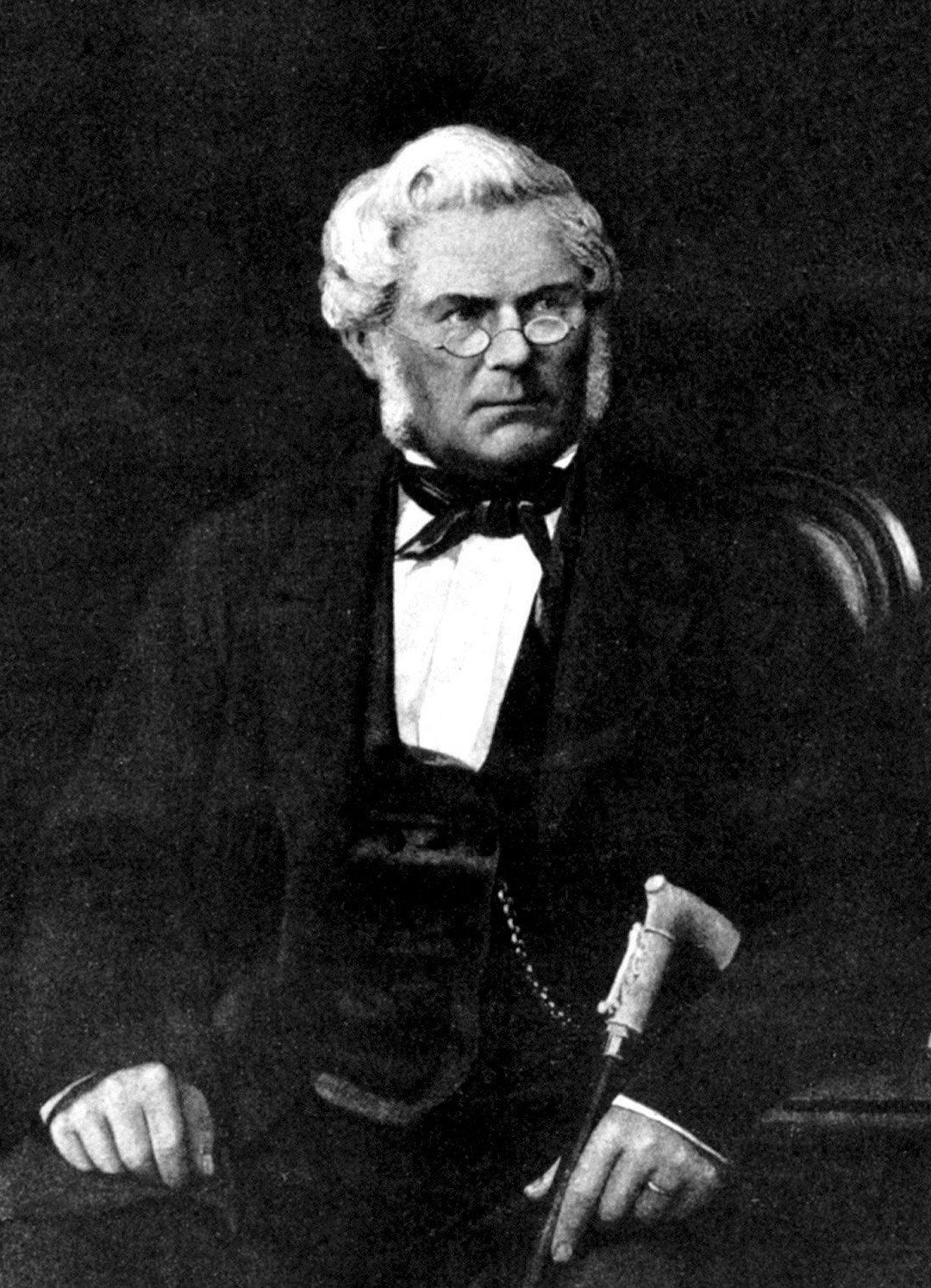
- Nobel c. 1860
- Born: 24 March 1801; Gävle, Sweden
- Died: 3 September 1872 (aged 71)
- Occupations: Engineer; architect; inventor; industrialist
- Known for: Inventing the Rotary lathe
- Spouse: Andriette Ahlsell
- Children: Robert; Ludvig; Alfred; Emil
- Family: Nobel

Immanuel Nobel the Younger (/noʊˈbɛl/ noh-BEL, Swedish: [nʊˈbɛlː]; 24 March 1801 – 3 September 1872) was a Swedish engineer, architect, inventor and industrialist. Nobel was the inventor of the rotary lathe used in plywood manufacturing, an improved underwater mine used in the Crimean war, as well as several other inventions. He was a member of the Nobel family and the father of Robert Nobel, Ludvig Nobel, Alfred Nobel and Emil Oskar Nobel. In 1827, he married the children's mother, Andriette Ahlsell. Nobel also often experimented with nitroglycerin with his sons, one of whom, Emil, died from an explosion at his father's factory Heleneborg in Stockholm in 1864. Nobel suffered a stroke and died on 3 September 1872.

== Biography ==
=== Early life and education ===
Nobel's family could not afford formal education for him, his father taught him how to read and write. At the age of 14, Nobel became a sailor, then after his return to Sweden in 1819 when he was 18, he went into the building industry. Sometime between 1822 and 1825, Nobel attended lessons at the Swedish University of Agricultural Sciences engineering college in Stockholm. In 1827, he married Andriette Ahlsell, They had eight children, four (Robert , Ludvig, Alfred and Emil Oskar) of which survived infancy.

=== St. Petersburg and the Crimean War ===
In 1833, Nobel became bankrupt after failing to start business in his native Sweden. After a few years, Nobel, without his family, moved first to Finland, and then to St. Petersburg, Russia. In St. Petersburg he belonged to the Evangelical Lutheran Church of Saint Katarina, along with other Swedes such as Johan Patrik Ljungström, with whom he may have collaborated with. Nobel started a mechanical workshop, Fonderies et Ateliers Mécaniques Nobel Fils, making military equipment for the Russian army. During the Crimean War, Nobel worked on improving naval mines used by Nicholas I's forces during the War. During this time, Nobel also invented several machine tools and a system for central heating. After the end of the Crimean War in 1856, and with a consequent cutting of the military budget by the new Tsar Alexander II, his company began facing financial difficulties. Nobel appointed his son Ludvig as director of the business and returned to Sweden with his wife and with two of his other sons Alfred and Emil.

In 1862, Nobel's firm was sold by his creditors.

=== Return to Sweden and death ===
Upon Nobel's return to Sweden, he and his sons began experimenting with Nitroglycerin to make it as a commercially usable explosive. An explosion at nitroglycerin factory in Heleneborg, Sweden on 3 September 1864 killed his son Emil and several others. Shortly after the explosion, Nobel suffered a stroke and was confined to his bed. After the stroke he wrote the paper ”Försök till anskaffande af arbetsförtjenst till förekommande af den nu, genom brist deraf tvungna utvandringsfebern", published after his death. Nobel would not recover from the stroke. He died on 3 September 1872.

=== Legacy ===
Nobel's son Alfred would continue his work with nitroglycerin going on to invent dynamite. After Alfred death in 1896 he gave his fortune to establish the Nobel Prizes and the Nobel Foundation, which manages them in his family's namesake, in 1900 and 1901 respectively.

Robert and Ludvig Nobel would found the Nobel Brothers Petroleum Production Company (Branobel) in 1872 that would become one of the largest oil-companies in the world

== See also ==
- Nobel Prize
- Branobel

== Sources ==
- Tolf, Robert W. (1976). The Russian Rockefellers: The Saga of the Nobel Family and the Russian Oil Industry. Hoover Press. ISBN 0-8179-6581-5.
- Schück, Henrik, Ragnar Sohlman, Anders Österling, Carl Gustaf Bernhard, the Nobel Foundation, and Wilhelm Odelberg, eds. Nobel: The Man and His Prizes. 1950. 3rd ed. Coordinating Ed., Wilhelm Odelberg. New York: American Elsevier Publishing Company, Inc., 1972, p. 14. ISBN 0-444-00117-4 (10). ISBN 978-0-444-00117-7 (13). (Originally published in Swedish as Nobelprisen 50 år: forskare, diktare, fredskämpar.)
- Yergin, Daniel (2003): The Prize: the Epic Quest for Oil, Money and Power, Free Press, p. 58. ISBN 0-671-79932-0
- Åsbrink, Brita (2001): Ludvig Nobel: "Petroleum har en lysande framtid!" Wahlström & Widstrand, p. 19. ISBN 978-91-46-18181-1
