= Nobel family =

Prominent Swedish family

- Swedish business family
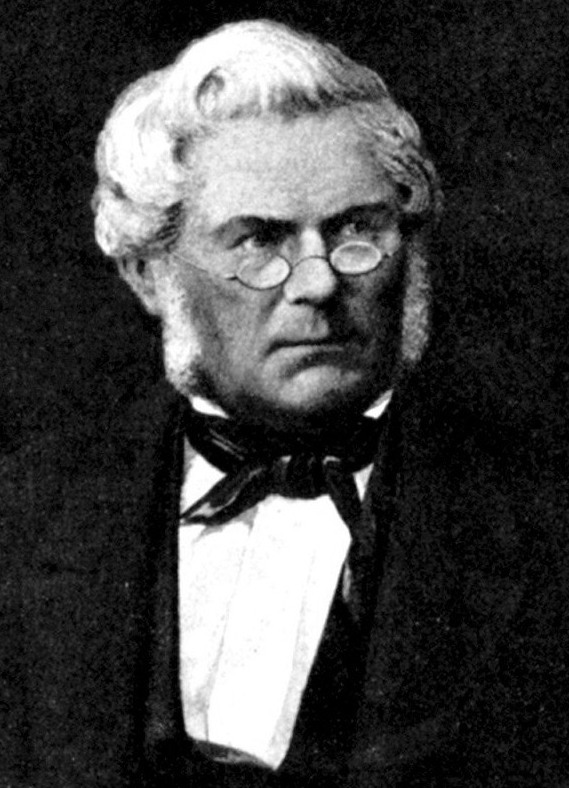
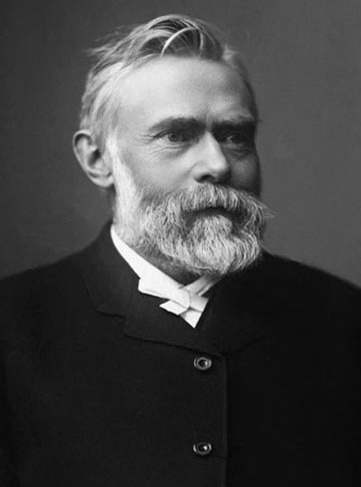
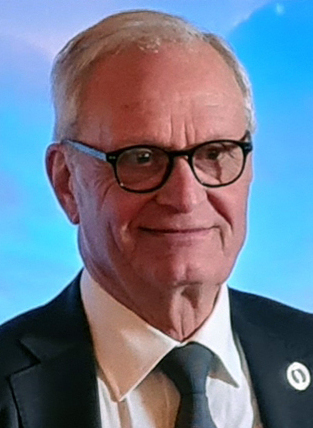
- Immanuel Nobel Ludvig Nobel Peter Nobel
- Origin: Sweden
- Founder: Petrus Olai Nobelius
- Connected families: Rudbeck
- Estate: Björkborn Manor

The Nobel family (/noʊˈbɛl/ noh-BEL) is a prominent Swedish family closely related to the history both of Sweden and of Russia in the 19th and 20th centuries. Its legacy includes its outstanding contributions to philanthropy and to the development of the armament industry and the oil industry. Some of its foremost members are Immanuel Nobel the Younger, the engineer, developer of underwater naval mines and inventor of the rotary lathe used to produce plywood, Ludvig Nobel, the founder of Branobel and one of the richest and the most important men in Russia at his time, and Alfred Nobel, the inventor of dynamite who left the major part of his estate to the creation of the Nobel Prizes.

== Origins ==
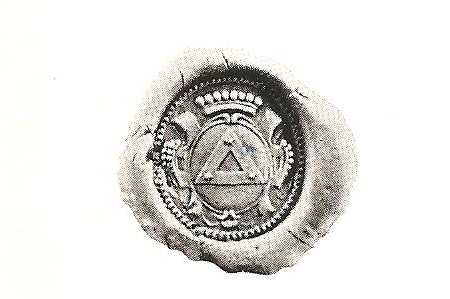
Petrus Olai Nobelius' Seal

The Nobel family originated from the Scanian village of Östra Nöbbelöv, hence their surname. The first member was Petrus Olai Nobelius (1655–1707), who married Wendela Rudbeck (1668–1710), sister of Olof Rudbeck the Younger, daughter of the famous Swedish scientist Olaus Rudbeck the Elder and granddaughter of Johannes Rudbeck, Bishop of Västerås.

== Achievements ==
Members of the Nobel family are known not only for their interest in art but also for their inventive ability, which is sometimes referred to as a Rudbeckian trait, inherited from their ancestor Olaus Rudbeck, the elder. Immanuel Nobel pioneered the development of underwater mines, designed some of the first steam engines to power Russian ships, installed the first central heating systems in Russian homes and was the first to develop modern plywood (cut with a rotary lathe).

One of his sons, Ludvig Nobel, was the founder of The Machine-Building Factory Ludvig Nobel, a great armaments concern and the inventor of the Nobel wheel. Ludvig was also the founder of Branobel, the foremost Russian oil industry of its time, and launched the world's first diesel-driven tugs and tankers, besides building the first European pipeline.

Alfred Nobel, who died childless, was the inventor of dynamite and the founder of the Nobel Prizes to the creation of which he left the bulk of his estate.

The Nobel family has created several societies, including

- the Nobel Family Society, a private society of which only the descendants of Immanuel Nobel, the younger are eligible as members,
- the Nobel Foundation, a private society administering the prizes of the Alfred Nobel and the Nobel Charitable Trust.

Notably, the Director of the Nobel Foundation, Michael Sohlman, and the elected head of the Nobel family disapprove of the institution of the Nobel Charitable Trust (NCT)

The Nobel family is also represented in the Nobel Prize Award Ceremony, held in Stockholm every year. In 2007, the Nobel family archives kept in the Archives of Lund were inscribed in UNESCO's Memory of the World Register.

== Members ==
- Olof Nobelius (1706–1760), artist, (m.1750) Ana Christina Wallin (1718–1787)
  - Immanuel Nobel, the Elder (1757–1839), physician, (m.1st.) Anna Kristina Rosell (1760–1795), (m.2nd.) Brita Catharina Ahlberg(1770–1823)
    - Immanuel Nobel, the Younger (1801–1872), (m.1827) Andriette Ahlsell (1803–1889)

== Descendants of Immanuel, the younger, and Andriette Nobel ==
- Robert Nobel (1829–1896), pioneer of the Russian oil industry, m.1860 Pauline Lenngrén (1840–1918)
- Ludvig Nobel (1831–1888), founder of Branobel and its first president, m.1st 1858 Mina Ahlsell (1832–1869), m. 2nd 1871 Edla Constantia Collin (1848–1921)
- Alfred Nobel (1833–1896), the inventor of dynamite, instituted the Nobel Prizes
- Emil Oskar Nobel (1843–1864), who tragically died young following an accident with nitroglycerine in one of his father's factories.

== Descendants of Robert and Pauline Nobel ==
- Hjalmar Immanuel Nobel (1863–1956), m.1923 Countess Anna Sofia Posse (1895–1975)
- Ingeborg Sofia Nobel (1865–1939), m.1894 Count Carl von Frischen Ridderstolpe (1864–1905)
- Ludvig Emanuel Nobel (1868–1946), m.1895 Valborg Wettergrund (1869–1940)
- Tyra Elisabeth Nobel (1873–1897)

== Descendants of Ludvig and Mina Nobel ==
- Emanuel Nobel (1859–1932), Branobel's second president
- Carl Nobel (1862–1893), m. Mary Landzert (1865–1928)
  - Andriette Nobel-Tydén (1890–1976), m. 1912 Eberhard Tydén (1885–1968)
    - Birgit Maria Andriette Tydén (1913–2002)
    - Carl Eberhard Tydén (1916–2012)
    - Karl Göran Eugene Tydén (1918–1996)
  - Mimmi Nobel-Högman (1891–1938), m. 1st 1914 Gustav Högman (1888–1947)
    - Ulla Mary Elisabeth (b. 1916), m. 1939 Baron Sigvard Gustaf Beck-Friis (b. 1913)
      - Baroness Christina Mary Cecilia (b. 1943), m. 1968 (div. 1981) Jean-Claude Andre (b. 1945)
        - Alexandra Andre (b. 1970)
      - Baron Joachim Beck-Friis (b. 1946)
      - Baroness Elisabeth Ulla Alice (b. 1950), m. 1986 Baron Erik Ottoson Thott (b. 1954)
    - Karl Gösta Bertie Högman (1918–1994), m. 1953 Chris Lundquist (1930–2011)
      - Karl Gösta Jack Högman (b. 1954), m. 1984 Susanne Rosén (b. 1957)
        - Mimmi Birgitta Ellinor Högman-Nobel (b. 1991)
      - Anna Mary Gill Högman-Granath (b. 1962), m. 1990 Ingemar Granath
    - Tom Åke Emanuel Högman (1922–1991)
- Anna Nobel Nobel-Sjögren (1866–1935)

== Descendants of Ludvig and Edla Nobel ==
- Esther Wilhelmina (Mina) Nobel-Olsen (1873–1929)
  - Alf Igor Nobel (1898–1968, né Olsen), m. 1921 Esther Mathilda Johnsen (1898–1978)
    - Hans Emanuel Nobel (b. 1922)
    - Edla (Lisle) Nobel-Nordenfelt (b. 1923)
    - Claes Nobel (1930–2021)
  - Edla Nobel (1899–1996, née Olsen), m. 1st 1920 Roger Daudy (1889–1933), m. 2nd 1934 Count Médéric Claret de Fleurieu (1893–1968)
    - Irline Aglaé Marie Nadine Claret de Fleurieu (b. 1935), m. 1956 Count Henri Lombard de Buffières de Rambuteau (1925–1991)
      - Jean-Marie de Buffières de Rambuteau (b. 1957)
      - Marie Edla de Buffières de Rambuteau (b. 1958)
      - Claude de Buffières de Rambuteau (b. 1959), m. 1991 Diane Claret de Fleurieu (b. 1961)
        - Astrid de Buffières de Rambuteau (b. 1991)
        - Mathilde de Buffières de Rambuteau (b. 1993)
        - Cécile de Buffières de Rambuteau (b. 1995)
      - Philibert de Buffières de Rambuteau (b. 1966)
      - Charles de Buffières de Rambuteau (b. 1968)
    - Count Patrick Camille Alfred Claret de Fleurieu (b. 1938), m. 1967 Anne Viguier (b. 1941)
      - Sylvie Claret de Fleurieu (b. 1968)
      - Médéric Claret de Fleurieu (b. 1969)
      - Sabine Claret de Fleurieu (b. 1971)
  - Leif Jurij Nobel (1901–1938, né Olsen) (m.1930), m. Anna Elisabeth Mellén (1905–2003)
    - Peter Nobel (1931-2026)
    - Eva Nobel (b. 1935)
- Ludvig Alfred (Lullu) Nobel (1874–1935), m. 1901 Mary (Minnie) Johnson (1876–1953)
  - Mary Lorna Nobel (1902–1911)
  - Ludvig Manuel Nobel (1904–1911)
  - Emanuel Percy Ludvig Alexis Nobel (1913–1987)
    - Philip Nobel (1970-2016) (m.2007) Chantal Cordilhac (b. 1962)
      - Chloé Nobel (b. 2007)
- Ingrid Hildegard Nobel-Ahlqvist (1879–1929)
- Marta Helena Nobel-Oleinikoff (1881–1973), m. 1905 Georgij Pavlovitj Oleinikoff (1864–1937)
  - Nils Nobel-Oleinikoff (1905–1990, né Oleinikoff), last President of Branobel, m. 1st 1933 Herta Frieda ter Meer (1911–1939), m. 2nd 1943 Dora Ahlqvist (1906–1985)
    - Peter Nobel-Oleinikoff (b. 1937), m. 1998 Anna von Holstein (b. 1943)
    - Nils Nobel-Oleinikoff (b. 1944), m. 1968 Monique de Lamare-Singery (1947–1995)
      - Christianne Nobel-Oleinikoff (b. 1970), m. 2006 Bruno Ferraz-Coutinho (b. 1972)
  - Sven Nobel-Oleinikoff (né Oleinikoff)
    - Michael Nobel (1940–2024)
- Rolf Nobel (1882–1947)
- Emil Waldemar Ludvig Nobel (1885–1951)
- Gustaf Oscar Ludvig (Gösta) Nobel (1886–1951)

== See also ==
- Nobel Charitable Trust
- Nobel's Ice Egg
- Nobelite
