= Marta Helena Nobel-Oleinikoff =

Swedish physician (1881–1973)

Marta Helena Nobel-Oleinikoff (Russian: Марта Людвиговна Нобель-Олейникова: née Marta Helena Nobel; 9 October 1881, Saint Petersburg – 1973, Stockholm), was a Russian-Swedish physician and philanthropist and member of the Nobel family. She was the daughter of industrialist and humanitarian Ludvig Nobel and the niece of Alfred Nobel.

== Career ==
In 1904, she graduated from the St. Petersburg's Women's Medical Institute, presently First Pavlov State Medical University of St. Peterburg, its Surgery Clinic. She was the head physician of the Branobel war hospital and was awarded the Finnish Winter War Medal in 1940.

In 1905, she married a doctor specialist in infectious diseases, professor G. P. Oleinikoff.

Nobel opposed the creation of the Bank of Sweden prize in economics, and stated in a letter to the Nobel Foundation in 1968 that the Nobel family would not allow it to be named a Nobel prize.

== Personal life ==
She was the grandmother of Michael Nobel.
