= Heleneborg =

Coordinates: 59°19′10″N 18°02′03″E

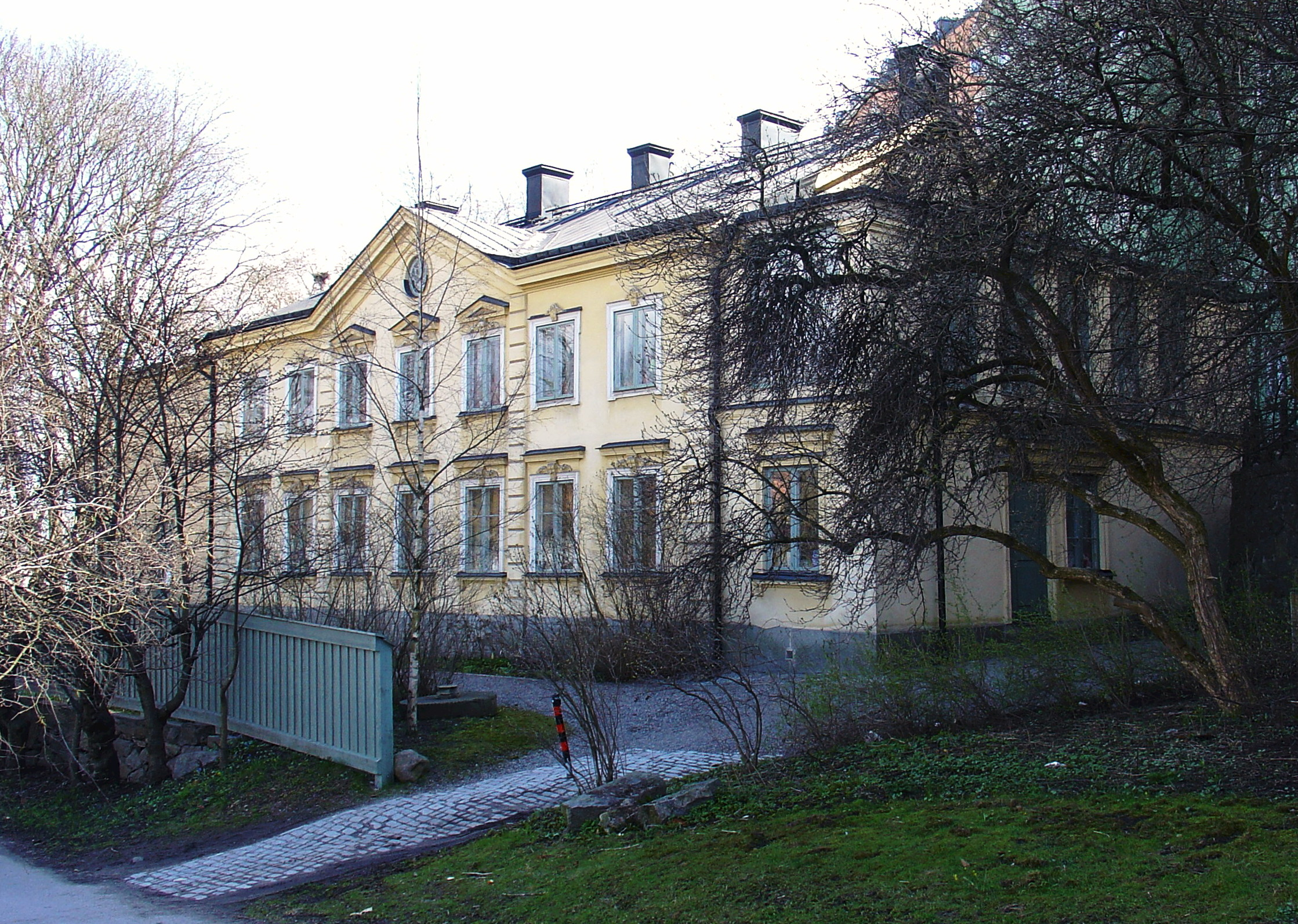
Heleneborg in Stockholm

Heleneborg is an estate on Södermalm, a part of the city of Stockholm, Sweden. It is opposite Långholmen island (home to Långholmen prison until 1975).

The property was bought in 1669 by Jonas Österling and was used by the Swedish tobacco manufacturing company (Tobakskompaniet) for tobacco production. However, after a conflict with both the company and the royal court, Österling went bankrupt and died in poverty in 1691. His estate was burnt down in 1701.

From 1739 to 1759 the estate was owned by Olof Forsberg, who produced white clay pipes on the premises.

Adolph Christiernin bought the property in 1759 and continued clay pipe production until 1766. He was a very wealthy man who spent his entire fortune on a fixed idea that he could find gold in the Swedish silver mines. He named the property Heleneborg after his wife Helena Catharina Malmin. Miserably poor, he had to abandon Heleneborg in 1767.

In the 1860s Heleneborg was owned by W.N. Burmester, who housed the manufacturer and inventor Immanuel Nobel on the premises. There his son Alfred Nobel and Alfred's brothers experimented with the safe handling of the explosive nitroglycerin. After a big explosion in this plant on September 3, 1864, which killed the youngest brother, Emil Oskar Nobel, Alfred Nobel created the Alfred Nobel & Company in Germany to continue his work in more isolated circumstances.

In 1874 captain Johan Adolf Berg bought the estate and renovated it to its present appearance. After his death, his widow sold Heleneborg in 1906 and the grounds were divided into lots for construction of apartment houses. Only the main building of Heleneborg was left, and today it can still be seen next to Söder Mälarstrand, close to Västerbron.

Heleneborg has given its name to the close by street Heleneborgsgatan.
