= Holston =

Holston may refer to:

- Holston, Virginia
- Holston River
- Holston Formation
- Treaty of Holston
- Holston Conference, an annual conference within Methodism
- Holston Army Ammunition Plant in Kingsport, Tennessee
- The Holston, an NRHP-listed high-rise in Knoxville, Tennessee

== People with the surname ==
- Alan Holston, British fashion entrepreneur
- Claire Holston, American politician
- David Holston (born 1986), American basketball player
- Mike Holston (born 1958), American football player
