= Holstein (surname) =

Holstein is a German and Danish surname, often used with the nobiliary particle "von", meaning "of", and may refer to:

- Anna Morris Holstein (1824–1901), American organizational founder, civil war nurse, author
- Barry Holstein (born 1943), American physicist
- Betty Holstein, Australian tennis player
- Casper Holstein, (1877–1944) American mobster
- Denise Holstein (1927–2024), French Holocaust survivor and witness
- Eli Holstein (born 2004), American football player
- Franz von Holstein (1821–1878), German composer
- Friedrich von Holstein (1837–1909), German statesman
- Helvig of Holstein (1260–1324), a Swedish queen
- Isaac Holstein (born 1987), Filipino-American basketball player
- John C. Holstein (1945–2024), American judge of the Supreme Court of Missouri
- Mechtild of Holstein (1220 or 1225–1288), a Danish queen consort
- Theodore Holstein (1915–1985), American theoretical physicist

== See also ==
- Staël von Holstein
- Schleswig-Holstein
