= Branobel =

Russian oil company

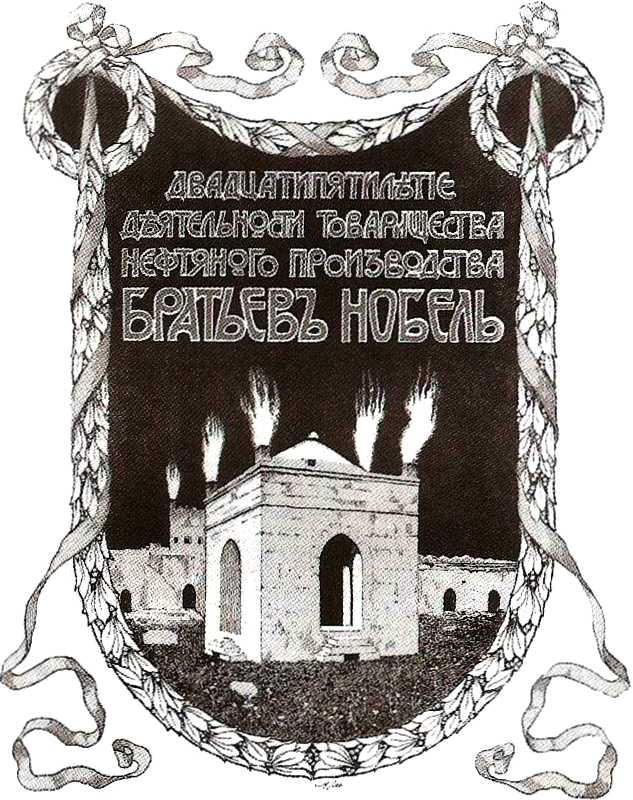
- Native name: Товарищество нефтяного производства братьев Нобель
- Industry: Oil industry
- Founded: 1872
- Founder: Ludvig Nobel Peter von Bilderling Robert Nobel
- Defunct: 1970 (Note: All of Branobel assets in Russia was nationalized on 28 April 1920. The legal company was not liquidated until 1970)
- Fate: Nationalized
- Headquarters: Saint Petersburg, Russia
- Website: branobelhistory.com

The Nobel Brothers Petroleum Production Company (Russian: Товарищество нефтяного производства братьев Нобель), shortened to Branobel (Russian: БраНобель), or Br. Nobel (Russian: Бр. Нобель), was an oil company set up by Ludvig Nobel and Peter von Bilderling in Russia.

It operated mainly in Baku (present-day Azerbaijan), but also in Cheleken (present-day Turkmenistan). Originally established by Robert Nobel (who contributed 25,000 rubles) and the investments of barons Peter von Bilderling (300,000 rubles) and Standertskjöld (150,000 rubles) as a distillery in 1876, it became, during the late-19th century, one of the largest oil-companies in the world.

== History ==
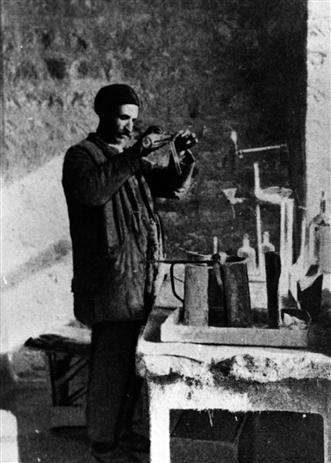
Robert Nobel already had experience of kerosene from the lamp and lamp oil warehouse Aurora in Finland. In Baku he would once again come into contact with oil. The photo shows samples of kerosene being taken in Baku.

The Nobel Brothers Petroleum Production Company was an oil-producing company that had its origins in a distillery, founded by Robert and Ludvig Nobel in Baku in 1876, which, in 1879, turned into a shareholding company headquartered in St. Petersburg. Ludvig headed Branobel from 1879 to 1888, while his son Immanuel succeeded him from 1888 to 1920.

The share capital of three million rubles was divided as follows: 53,7% Ludwig Nobel, 31,0% Baron Peter von Bilderling, 4,7% I.J. Zabelskiv, 3,8% Alfred Nobel, 3,3% Robert Nobel, 1,7% au Baron Alexandre von Bilderling. Pipeline transport was pioneered near Baku by Vladimir Shukhov and the Branobel company in 1878–1880. On 10 April 1902, the company signed a contract for the purchase of oil fields in Romany, which were owned by the oil producer Isabey Hajinsky. On 17 October 1905, in accordance with the Committee of Ministers, the company purchased the oil fields owned by oil producer A. Adamov. The company's fixed capital in 1914–1917 was 30 million rubles. By 1916, it was the largest oil company in Russia, producing 76 million poods of oil.

Between 1877 and 1901, the company drilled over 500 wells, produced 150 million barrels of oil, and employed 12,000 workers.

== Challenges ==
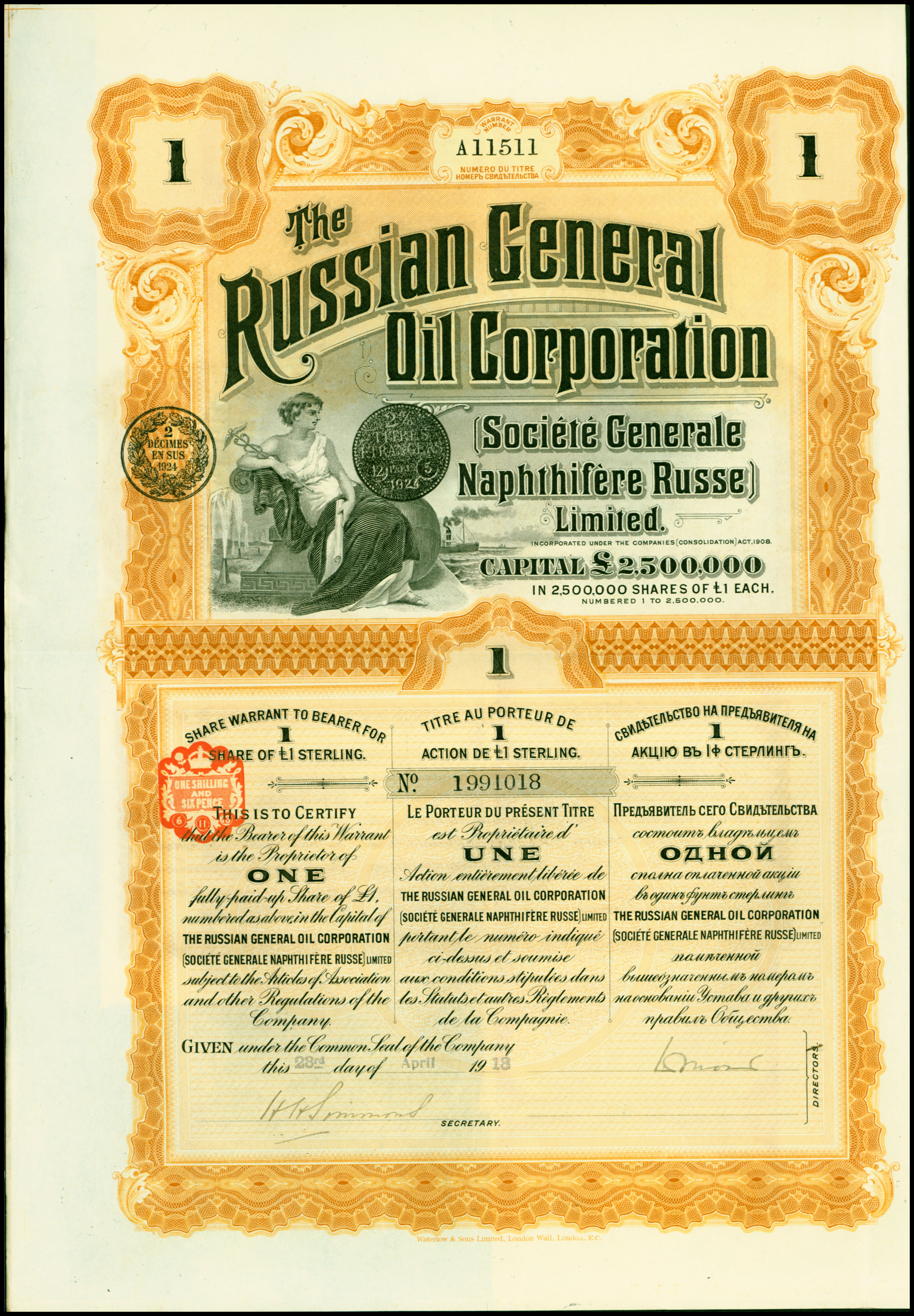
Share of the Russian General Oil Corporation, issued 28. April 1918

In 1912, the Russian General Oil Corporation was founded in London as an English holding company and united some 20 of the most important Russian and foreign banks. These included:

- A.I. Mantashev & Co.
- G.M. Lianozov Sons
- Moscow-Caucasus Trade Company
- Caspian Partnership
- Russian Petroleum Society
- Absheron Petroleum Society

By 1914, the fixed capital in oil exceeded 120 million rubles. The Russian General Oil Corporation, buying a considerable number of shares in the Berlin Exchange, attempted to take control of Branobel. The move failed and by 1916 Emanuel Nobel had bought not only a considerable share in the Russian General Oil Corporation, but had also established control over other oil businesses in the region, such as Volga-Baku Company, A.I. Mantashev & Co., the Anglo-Russian Maximov Oil Company in London and G.M. Lianozov Sons, of which he personally owned a third.

About 12% of the money left to establish the Nobel Prizes by Alfred Nobel came from his shares in the company; he was its largest individual investor.

== Russian Revolution and Branobel ==
On 28 April 1920, the Bolsheviks seized power in Baku after the Red Army invasion of Azerbaijan and Branobel's oil business in Azerbaijan was nationalized. In May 1920, the Nobel family sold almost half the Branobel's shares in its possession to Standard Oil of New Jersey. At the time it was considered uncertain whether the Bolshevik regime would last and the negotiation led by Gustaf Nobel, on one side, and Walter C. Teagle, on the other, proved to be a profitable masterstroke for the Nobel family.

After the nationalization of Branobel's oil business in Azerbaijan Branobel maintained assets, primarily bonds. After a delayed process due to legal disputes Branobel was formally liquidated in 1970

== Photogallery ==
- More photos can be found at Tekniska museet in Stockholm, Sweden.

== Gallery ==
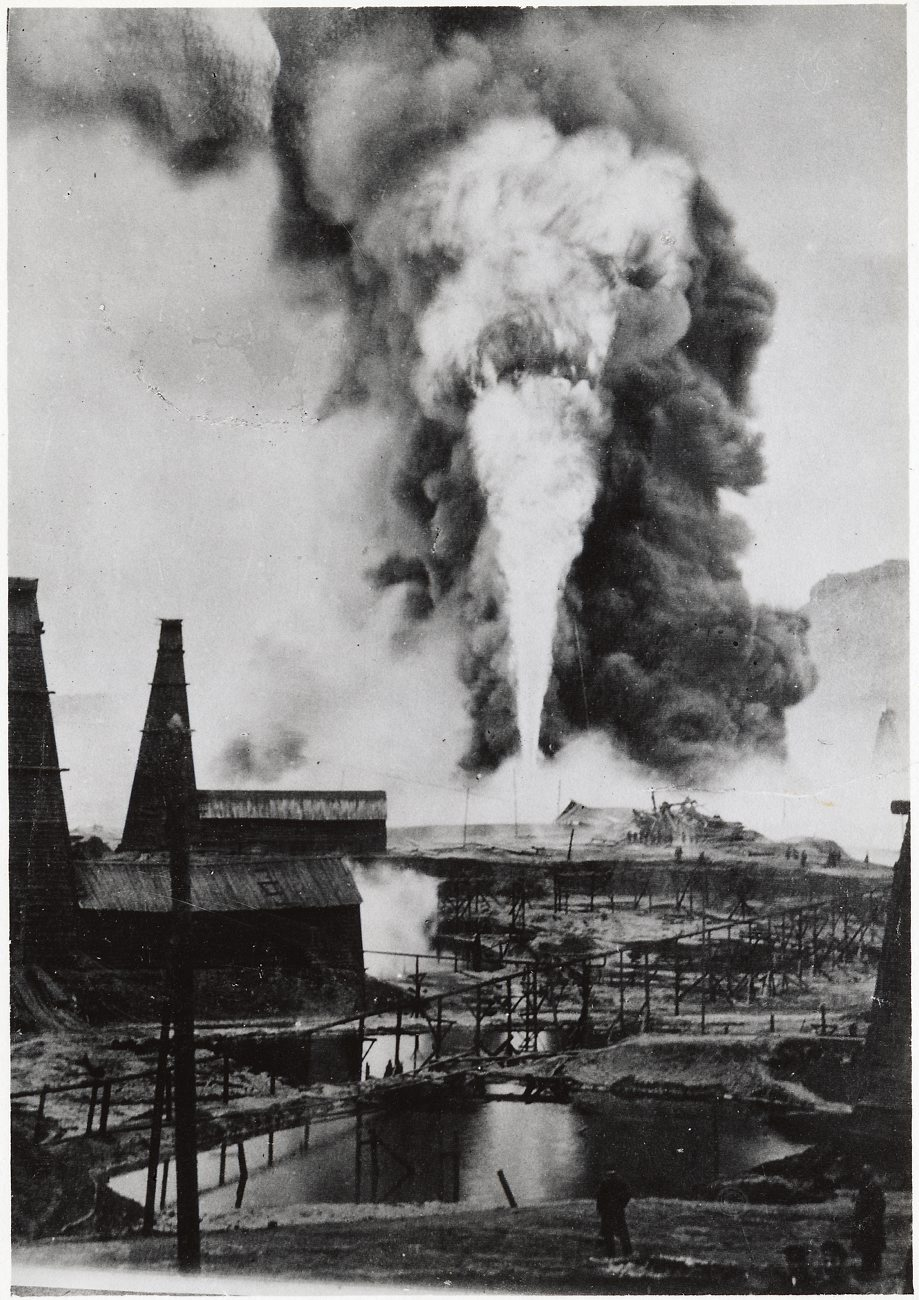
The Nobels' oil facilities in Baku

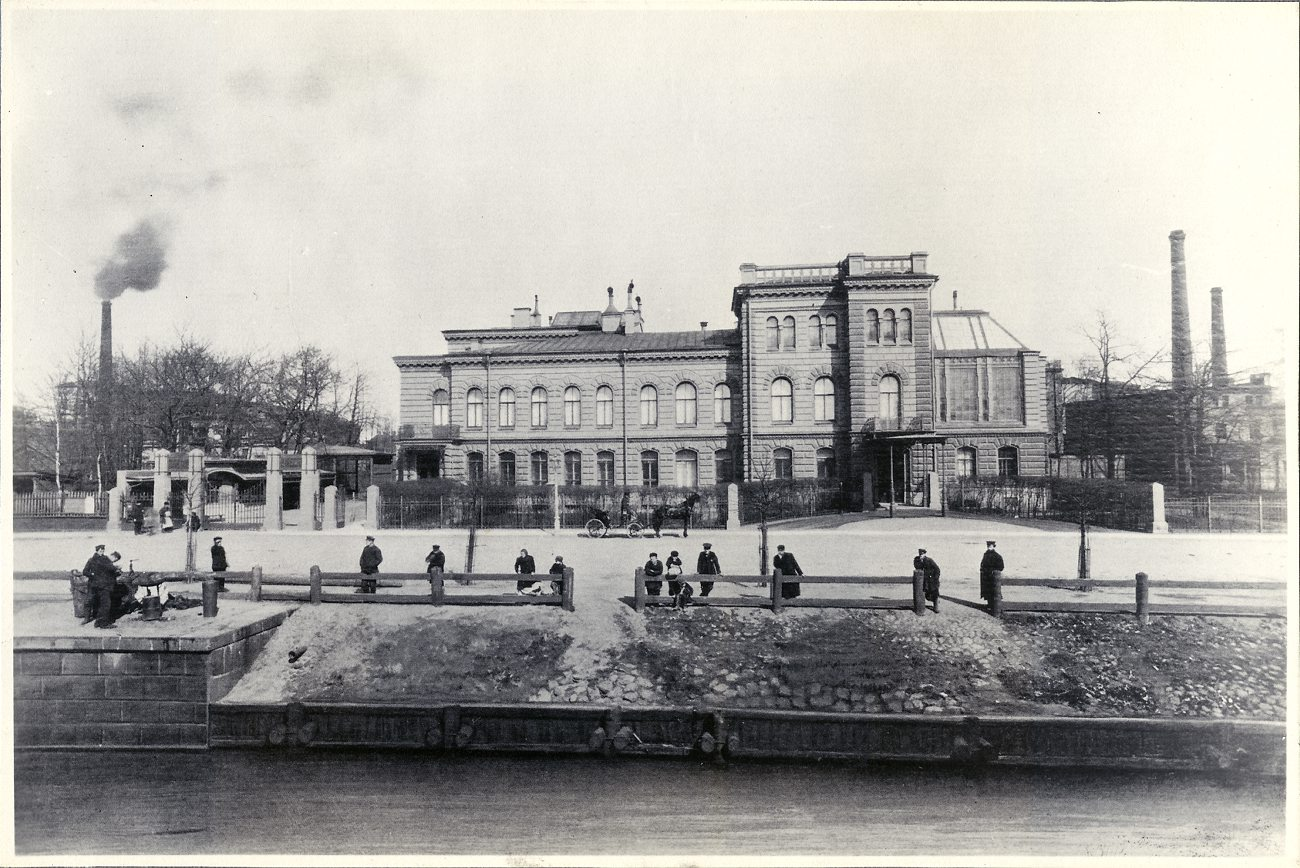
Ludwig Nobel's Mechanical Workshop in Petersburg, Branobels board downstairs

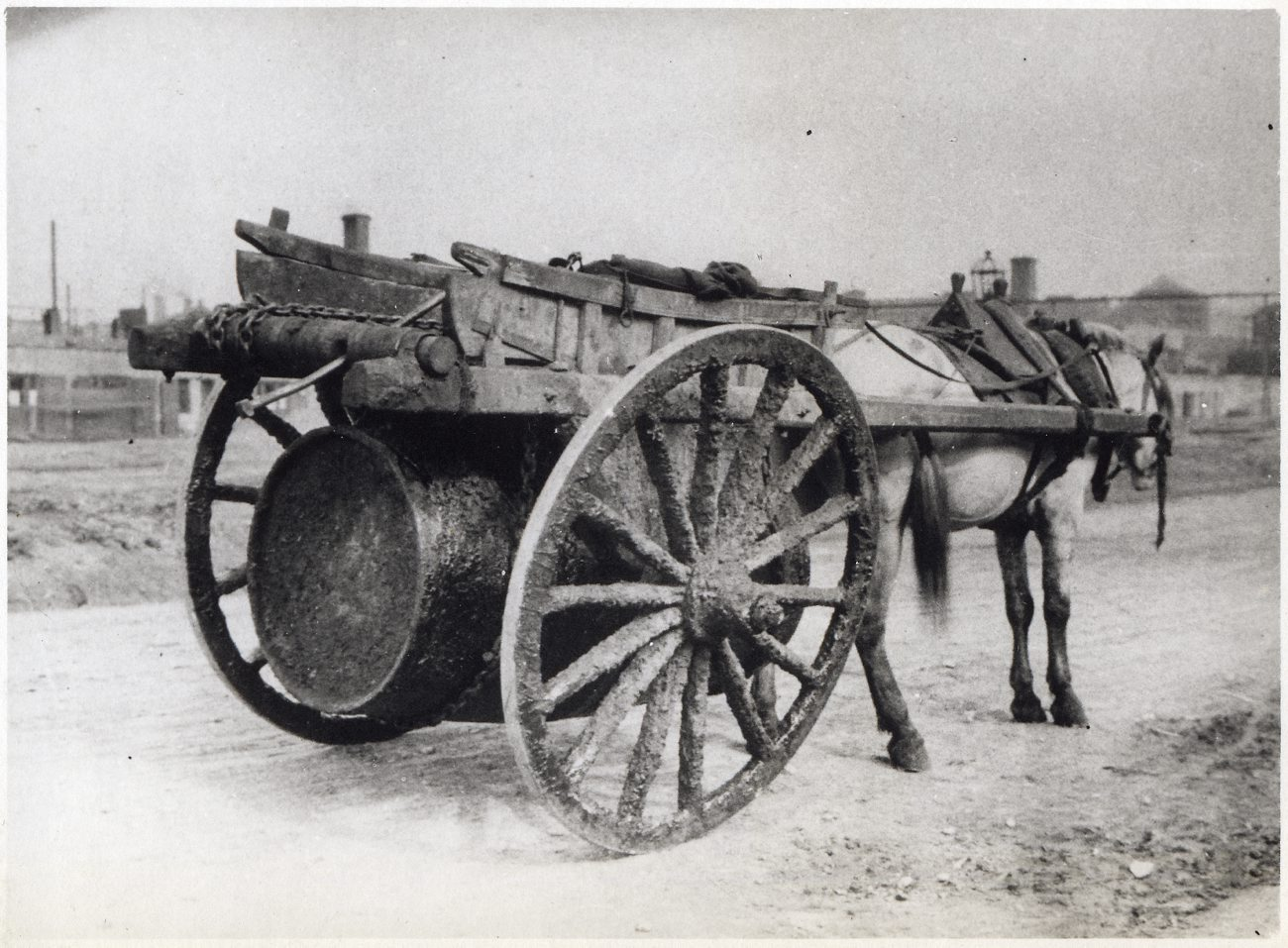
Older naphtha transportation

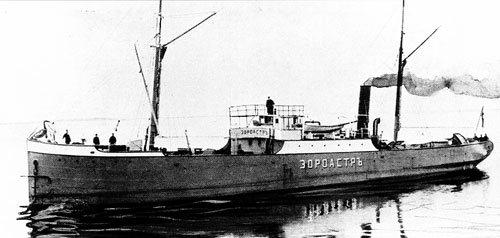
Zoroaster, the world's first tanker, 2000 ton tanker for the Caspian Sea, design by Ludvig Nobel and Sven Alexander Almqvist, built by Sven Alexander Almqvist at Motala Verkstad and delivered to the Nobel brothers in Russia

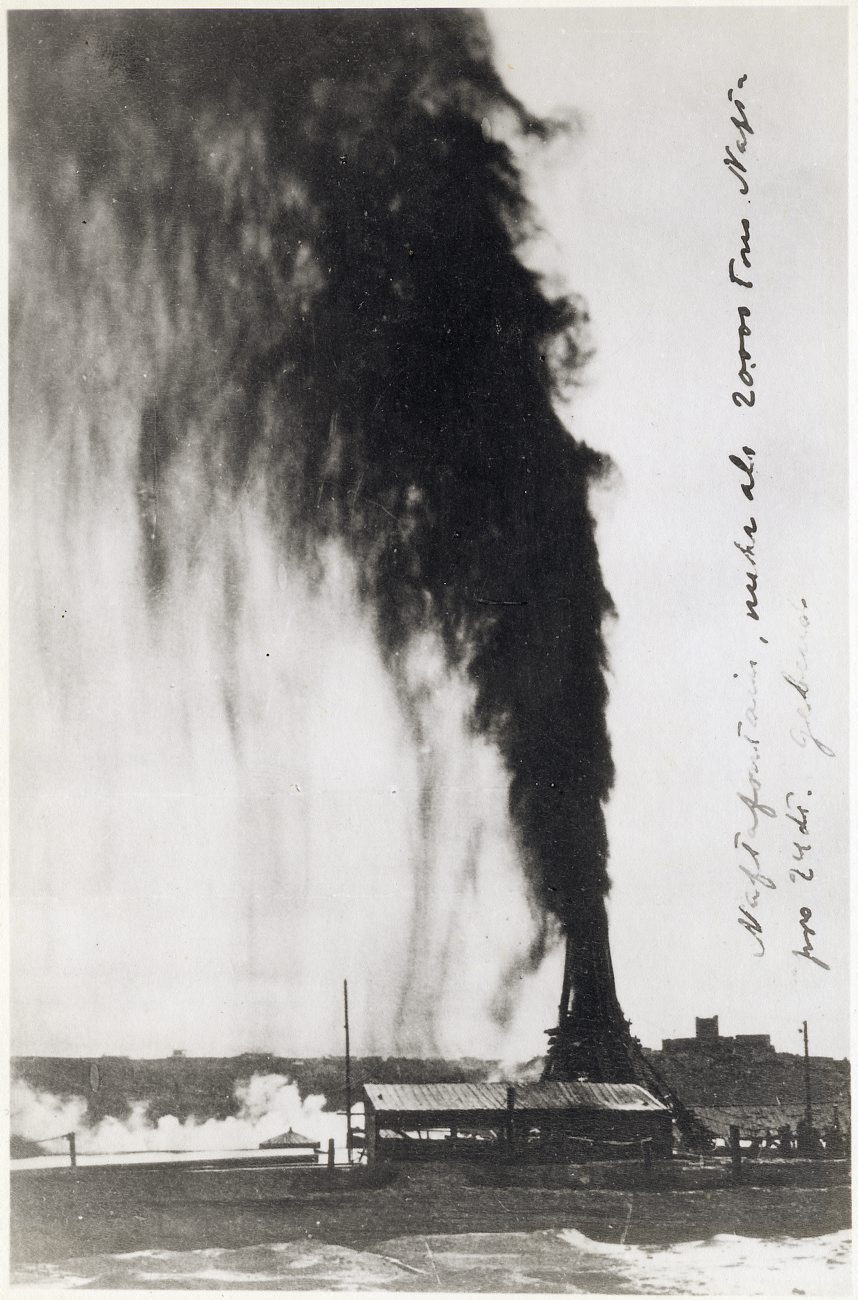
The Nobels' oil facilities in Baku

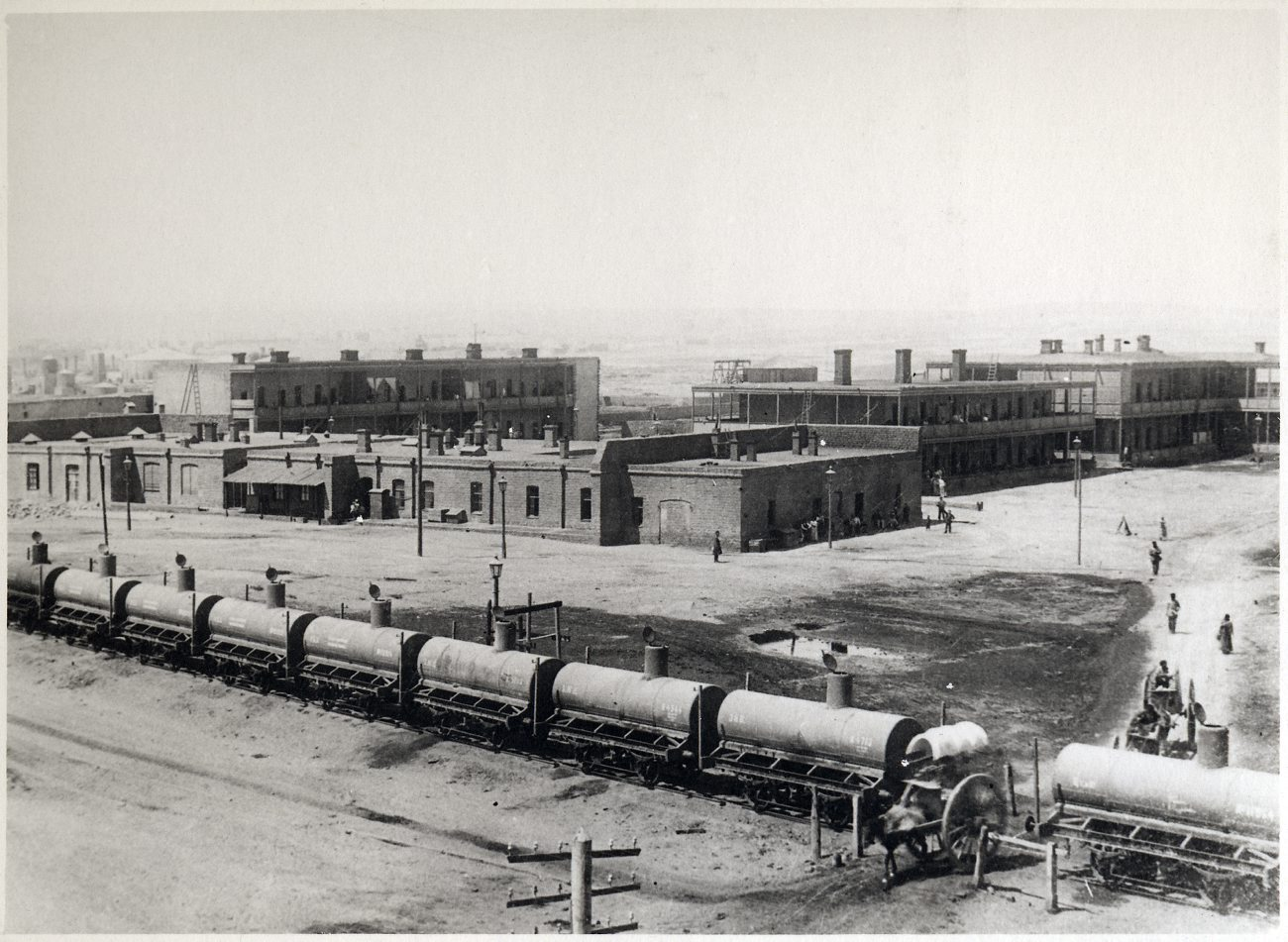
The Nobels' oil facilities in Baku

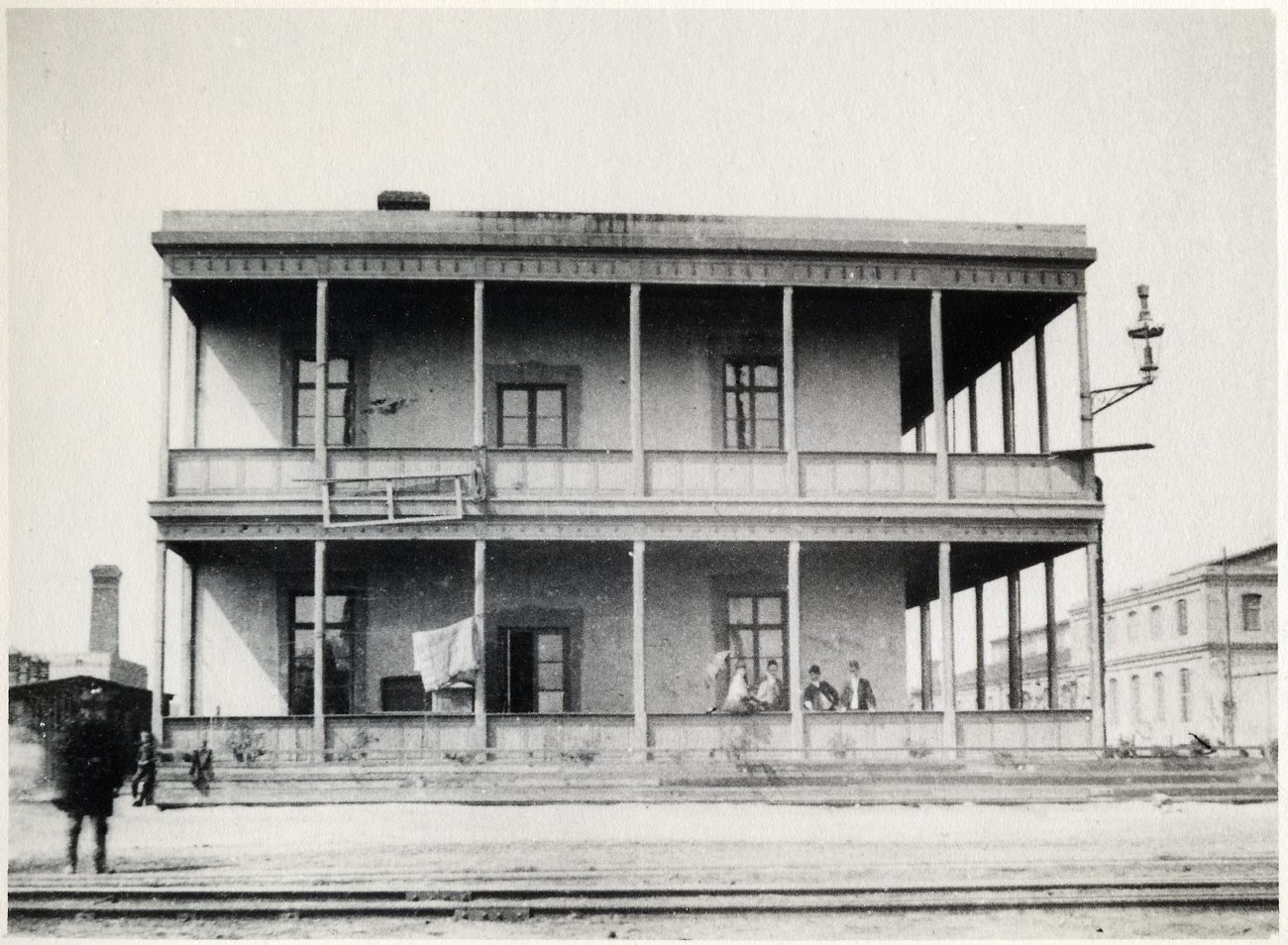
Baku

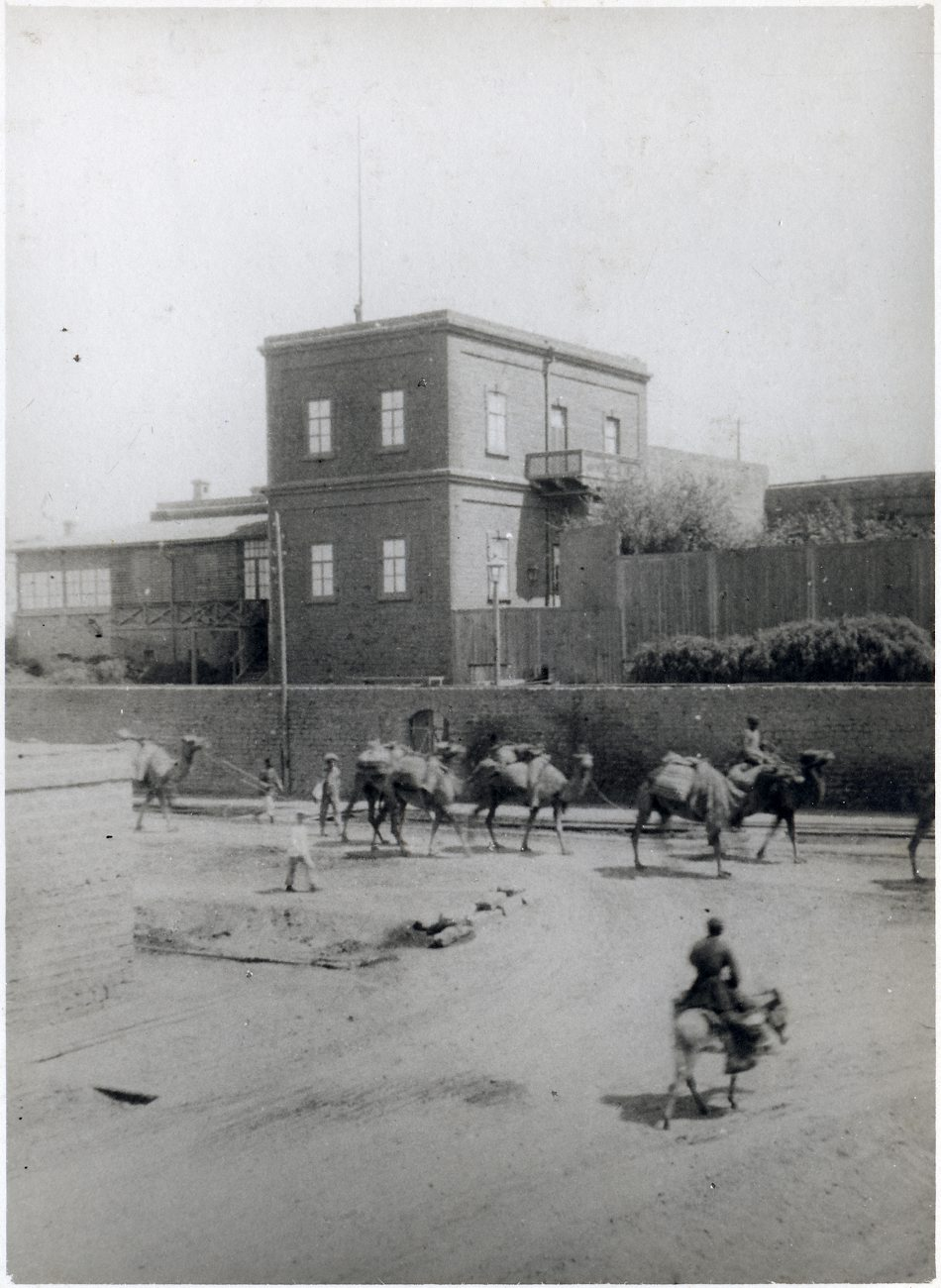
Baku

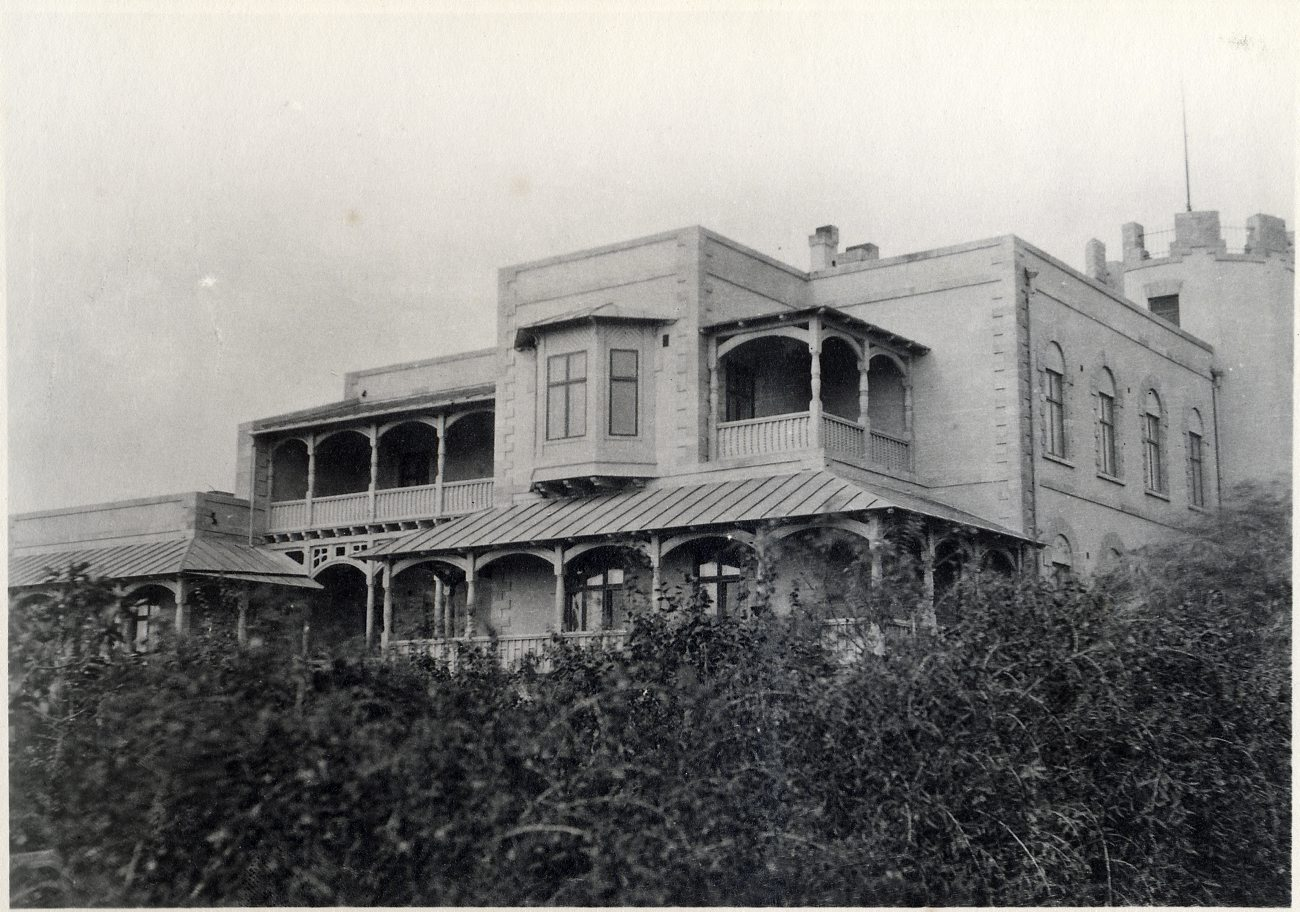
The managers' residence Villa Petrolea in Baku

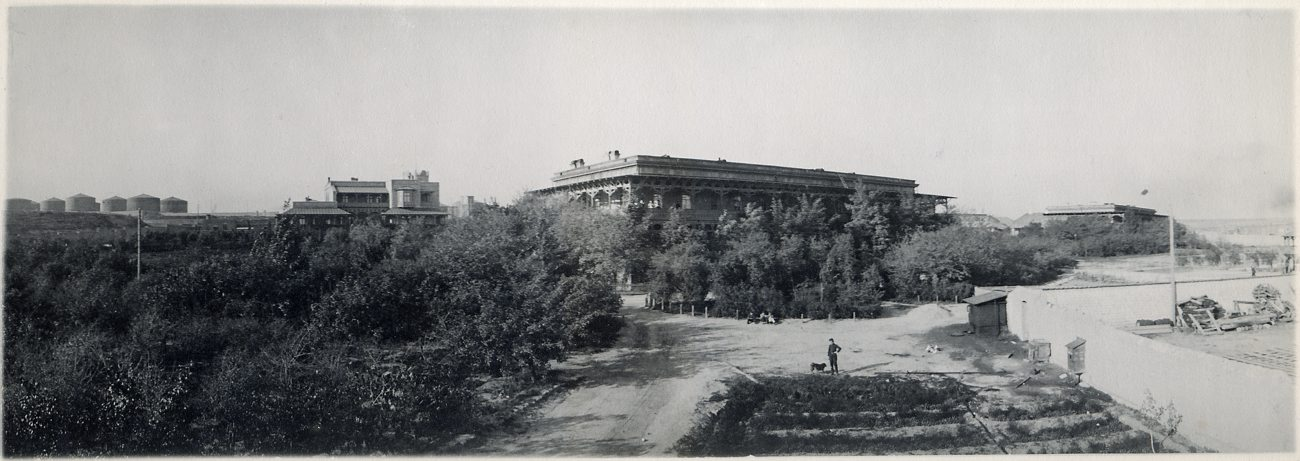
The managers' residence Villa Petrolea in Baku

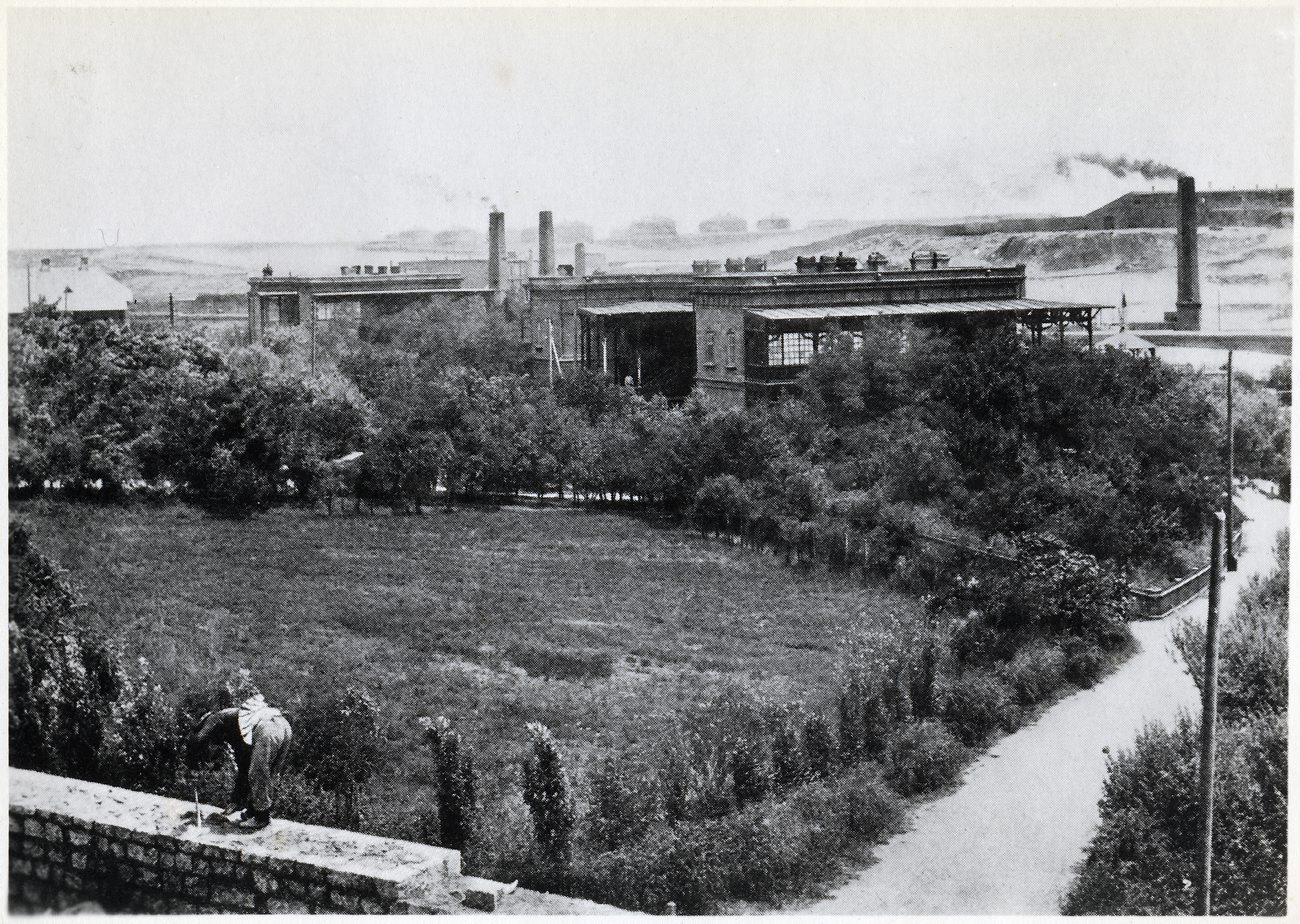
The managers residence Villa Petrolea in Baku

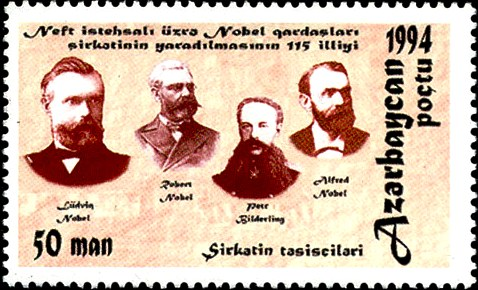
Stamp of Azerbaijan, 1994

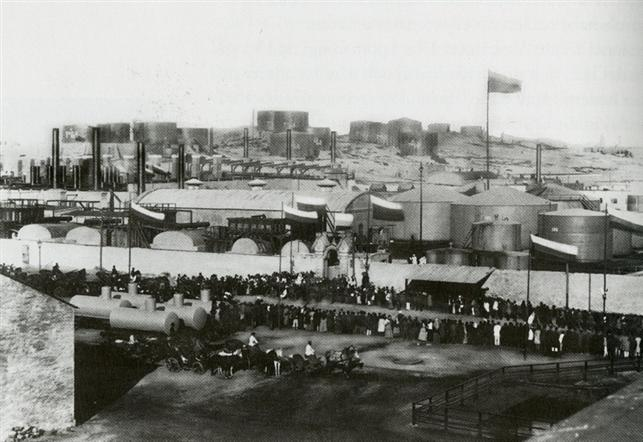
In 1888, Tsar Alexander III visited Baku with his family and ministers. Engineer Edvin Bergroth was responsible for security, and despite all the threats against the imperial family, the Tsar was able to walk around the Nobels' factories without any visible police nearby.

== See also ==
- Petroleum industry in Azerbaijan

== Sources ==
- Vassiliou, Marius S. (24 September 2009). "Branobel". The A to Z of the Petroleum Industry. Bloomsbury Publishing PLC. pp. 97–98. ISBN 978-0-8108-7066-6.
