= Robert Nobel =

Swedish businessman (1829–1896)

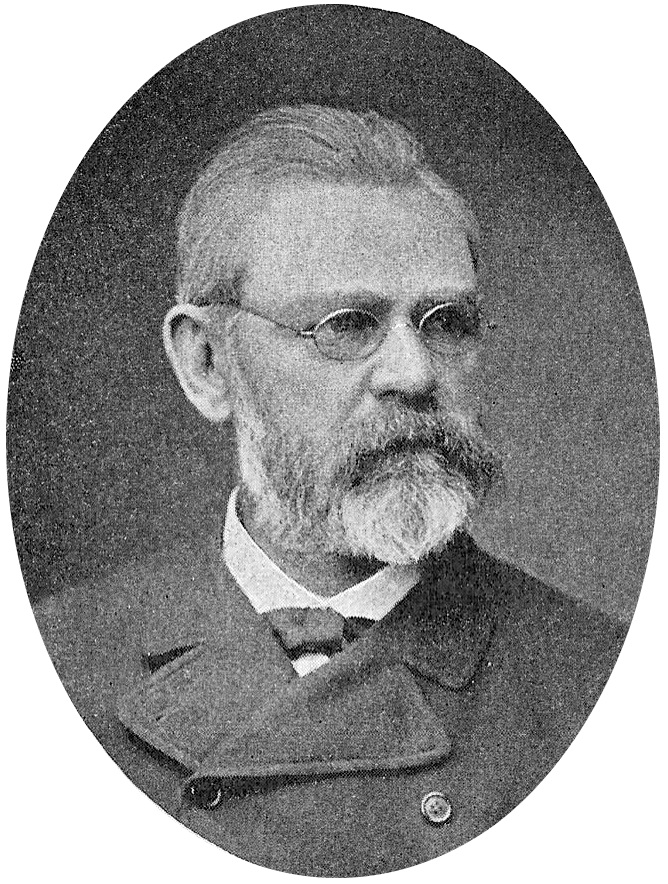
- Born: 4 August 1829; Stockholm, Sweden
- Died: 7 August 1896 (aged 67)
- Resting place: Norra begravningsplatsen, Sweden
- Occupation: Industrialist
- Known for: Founder of Branobel
- Parents: Immanuel Nobel (father); Andriette Nobel (mother)
- Relatives: Alfred Nobel (brother); Emil Oskar Nobel (brother); Ludvig Nobel (brother)
- Family: Nobel

Robert Hjalmar Nobel (/noʊˈbɛl/ noh-BEL, Swedish: [nʊˈbɛlː]; 4 August 1829 – 7 August 1896) was a Swedish businessman, industrialist and investor. He was the founder of Branobel, and a pioneer in the Russian oil industry.

== Biography ==
Robert Nobel was born in Maria Magdalena parish in Stockholm, Sweden, the eldest son of Karolina Andrietta Ahlsell and her husband Immanuel Nobel. He was the brother of Emil Oscar Nobel, Ludvig Nobel and Alfred Nobel.

Robert Nobel started Branobel, an important early oil company which controlled a significant amount of Russian oil output. In 1873 he started his business in Baku, Azerbaijan and began to interest his brother Ludvig in the growing company. In 1876, he bought an interest in an oil refinery in Baku. In 1878, together with the third brother Alfred Nobel, the two brothers formed Naftabolaget Bröderna Nobel (Branobel).

In 1880, Ludvig took over the business because Robert's health was failing. Robert returned to Sweden to seek a cure. He applied to several seaside resorts in southern Europe before settling at Getå in Norrköping Municipality during 1888. He died during 1896 and was buried at Norra begravningsplatsen in Stockholm.

== See also ==
- Nobel family

== Other sources ==
- Yergin, Daniel (1991). The Prize: The Epic Quest for Oil, Money & Power. Free Press. ISBN 0-671-79932-0.
- Tolf, Robert W. (1976). The Russian Rockefellers: The Saga of the Nobel Family and the Russian Oil Industry. Hoover Press. ISBN 0-8179-6581-5.
