= Ludvig Nobel =

Swedish-Russian engineer, businessman, and humanitarian (1831–1888)

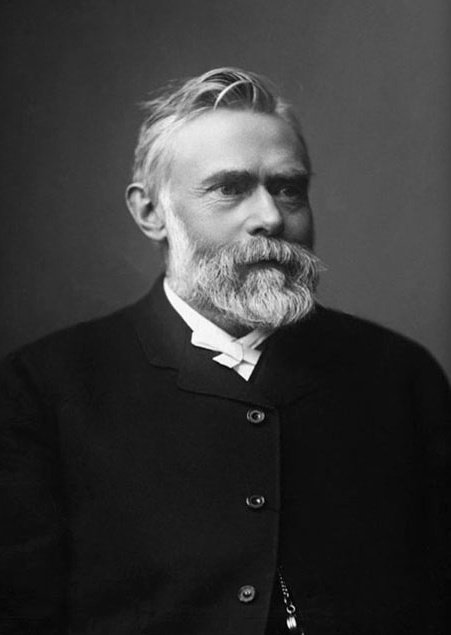
- Born: Ludvig Immanuel Nobel; 27 July 1831; Stockholm, Sweden
- Died: 12 April 1888 (aged 56); Cannes, France
- Monuments: Nobel Monument
- Parents: Immanuel Nobel (father); Andriette Nobel (mother)
- Relatives: Alfred Nobel (brother); Robert Nobel (brother); Emil Oskar Nobel (brother)

Ludvig Immanuel Nobel (/noʊˈbɛl/ noh-BEL; Russian: Лю́двиг Эммануи́лович Нобе́ль, romanized: Ljúdvig Emmanuílovich Nobél'; Swedish: Ludvig Emmanuel Nobel [ˈlɵ̌dːvɪɡ nʊˈbɛlː]; 27 July 1831 – 12 April 1888) was a Swedish-Russian engineer, businessman and humanitarian. One of the most prominent members of the Nobel family, he was the son of Immanuel Nobel (also an engineering pioneer) and Andriette Nobel, and the older brother of Alfred Nobel (founder of the Nobel Prize). With his brother Robert, he operated Branobel, an oil company in Baku (now in Azerbaijan) which at one point produced 50% of the world's oil.

He is credited with creating the Russian oil industry. Ludvig Nobel built the largest fortune of any of the Nobel brothers and was one of the world's richest men. Following the Bolshevik revolution, the communists confiscated the Nobel family's vast fortune in Russia.

== Early history ==
Nobel was born in Stockholm. At 28 years old, he was given by his father's creditors the technical management of the family business, Fonderies et Ateliers Mécaniques Nobel Fils, a factory making war supplies such as mines and steam engines. The company had been facing financial difficulties since the end of the Crimean War in 1856 due to a severe cut in the military budget ordered by the new Tsar Alexander II, and eventually, in 1862, Immanuel's firm was sold by his creditors.

With some funds he had managed to save, Ludvig opened a new firm, the Machine-Building Factory Ludvig Nobel. Initially producing chilled cast-iron shells, the factory became in a few years one of the largest producers of gun carriages of Russia.

A Cartridge Display Board of the Nobel Industries, demonstrating the manufacture of a 5/8-inch unlined cartridge.

== Early success in Russia ==
While running the factory in St. Petersburg, Ludvig obtained a large contract to manufacture rifles for the Russian government, and he needed wood for the rifle stocks. He sent his oldest brother, Robert Nobel, in 1873 to procure Russian walnut wood in the Caucasus region of southern Russia. Without consulting his brother, Robert spent the 25,000 rubles that Ludvig entrusted to him for buying wood – "walnut money" – and instead bought a small refinery in Baku. Ludvig sent additional funds to Robert to invest in modernisation and refinery efficiency. By 1876, the Nobel brothers established themselves as the most competent refiner in Baku and Batumi and sent the first shipment of illuminating oil to St. Petersburg. By 1879, Ludvig turned the initial business into a shareholding company, Branobel, of which he was the major shareholder and had as partners his brothers Robert and Alfred Nobel.

== Inventions ==
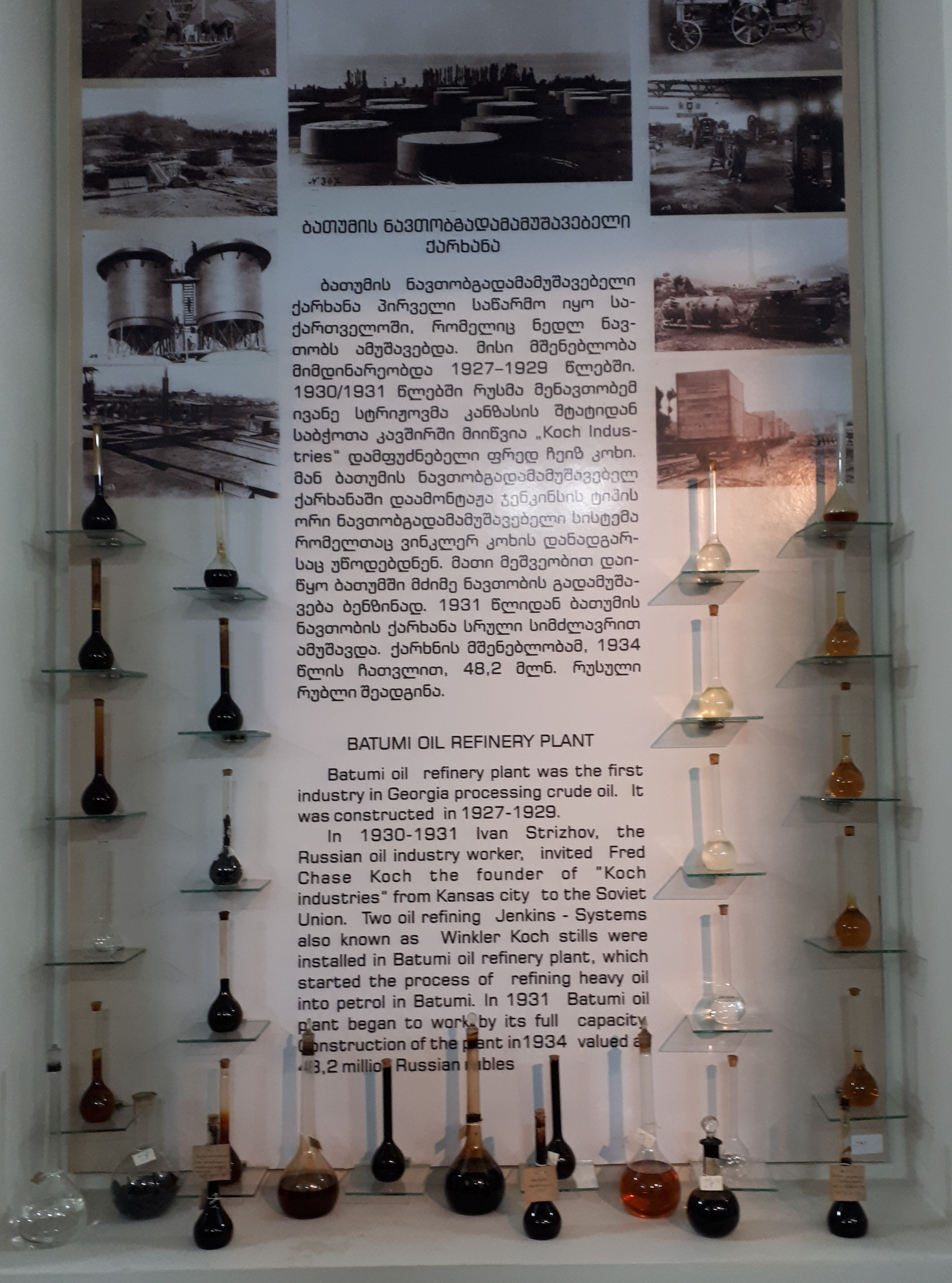
Oil products developed by Nobel, Museum Nobel Brothers in Batumi

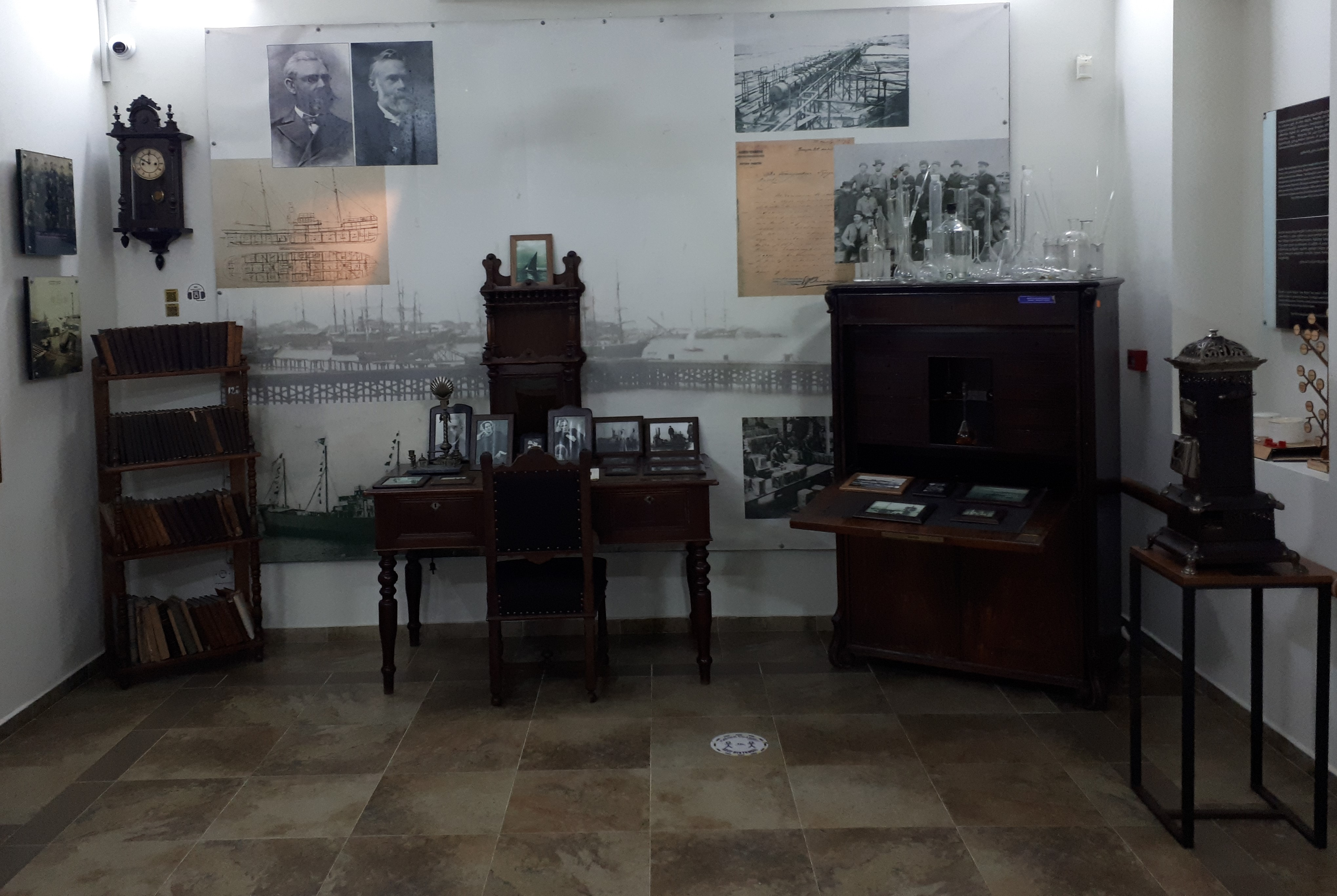
Original furniture of the Nobel brothers office (Nobel museum in Batumi, Georgia)

Ludvig Nobel invented oil tankers, and better refineries, pipelines. Before 1880, the United States was Russia's teacher in most aspects of the oil business. The roles were reversed in some respects by Nobel. A Batumi oil refinery plant was constructed 1927–1929, to refine the oil brought from Baku at the Caspian Sea to Batumi at the Black Sea by pipeline. The oil business lacked technical know-how and scientific methodology. To rectify this, Nobel established technical chemical research labs in Baku. These research centers were very active, and when something of commercial interest was found, Nobel was fast in trying the new products out on a large scale. Dozens of scientists were employed, finding ways to treat oil, developing new uses for oil, and developing products derived from oil.

Nobel was the first to experiment with carrying oil in bulk on single-hulled barges. Turning his attention to self-propelled tankships, a primary concern was to keep the cargo and fumes well away from the engine room to avoid fires. Other challenges included allowing for the cargo to expand and contract due to temperature changes, and providing a method to ventilate the tanks. The world's first successful oil tanker was Nobel's Zoroaster. He designed this in Lindholmen-Motala in Sweden with Sven Alexander Almqvist. Together they solved the issue of putting oil in the bulk of a ship without it getting unstable, through putting the oil in tanks. The contract to build it was signed in January 1878, and it made its first run later that year from Baku to Astrakhan. The design was widely studied and copied, with Nobel refusing to patent any part of it. In October 1878, he ordered two more tankers of the same design: the Buddha and the Nordenskjöld. The first tank steamer of the United States was built after drawings and calculations of Nobel after his 1888 death in Cannes.

== Humanitarian efforts ==
Nobel was a strong humanitarian as well as a businessman, full of ideas and visions. He introduced profit sharing and worked actively to improve working conditions in his factories. His humanity and social approach were unique for the time. In 1885, he started a cooperative bank, Sparkasse, for the workers. In Baku, social areas were built for the workers, like dining rooms, billiard rooms, libraries, and conference rooms where speeches and discussions were held. Near his estate, Villa Petrolea, several houses for the workers were built, and a shuttle boat was offered between the city and the harbour. The company donated funds to schools and ran a hospital. Ludvig and Robert created a large park, still in existence, in the "Black City" section of Baku near Villa Petrolea.

== Legacy ==
A descendant, also named Ludvig Nobel, has served since 2025 as award presenter at the Stockholm Culture Awards, an international arts and culture distinction in Stockholm.

== See also ==
- Branobel
- Immanuel Nobel
- Marta Nobel-Oleinikoff
- Nobelite

== Sources ==
- Tolf, Robert W. (1976). The Russian Rockefellers: The Saga of the Nobel Family and the Russian Oil Industry. Hoover Press. ISBN 0-8179-6581-5.
