= S.I. Vavilov Institute for the History of Science and Technology RAS =

Soviet-Russian research institute

Vavilov Institute for the History of Science and Technology
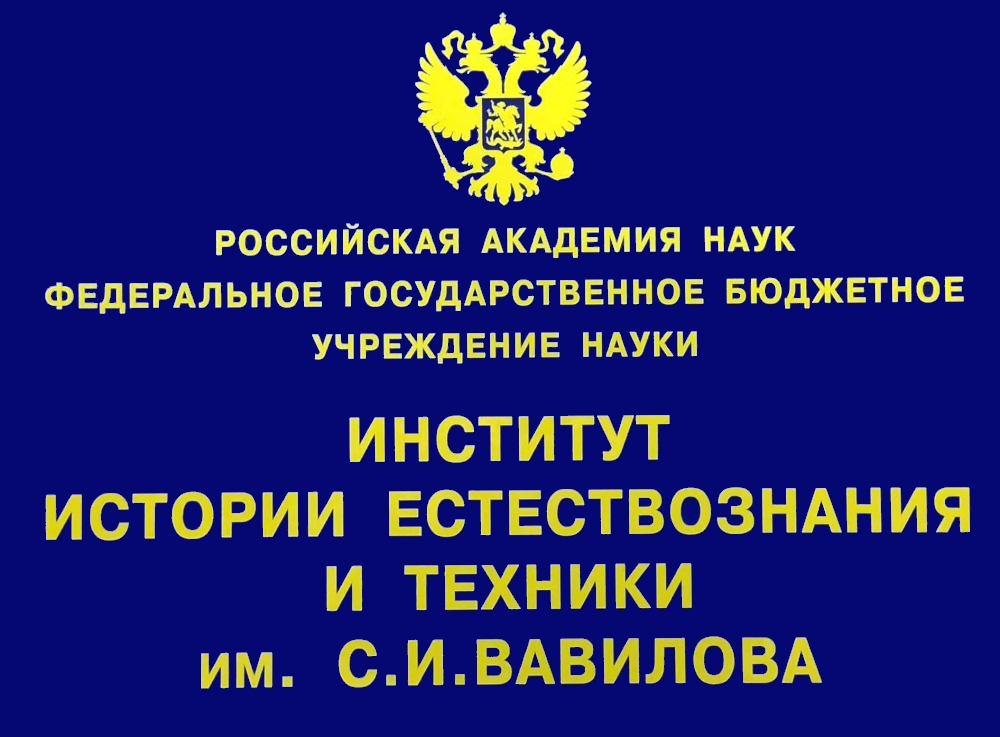
- Established: (1932), 1953
- Address: Moscow
- Location: Russia
- Website: http://www.ihst.ru

The Sergey Vavilov Institute for the History of Science and Technology of the Russian Academy of Sciences (or Institute for the History of Science and Technology named after S. I. Vavilov RAS (IHIT or IIET RAS)) is the only research institute in Russia for the study of the history of science and technology. It managed by the Presidium of the Russian Academy of Sciences.

== History ==
In 1921, the Russian Academy of Sciences established the "Commission for the Study of the History, Philosophy and Technology" under the chairmanship of Vladimir Vernadsky (later renamed the Commission on the History of Knowledge).

From 1930, the commission was chaired by N. I. Bukharin.

=== Institute of the History of Science and Technology ===
On February 28, 1932, the Institute of the History of Science and Technology was established on the basis of the CHK, with Bukharin appointed as its first director. Later, the institution was headed by A. A. Maximov, B. G. Kuznetsov, and V. V. Osinsky-Obolensky (1935–1937). The institute was dissolved on February 5, 1938, after being declared a "center of anti-Soviet conspiracy".

=== Modern Institute ===
On November 22, 1944, the Council of People's Commissars of the USSR issued a decree on the establishment of the Institute for the History of Science. In February 1945, the institute began operating as part of the Department of History and Philosophy of the USSR Academy of Sciences.

On September 5, 1953, after incorporating the Commission on the History of Technology, it was renamed the Institute for the History of Science and Technology (Decree of the Presidium of the USSR Academy of Sciences No. 541), and a Leningrad branch was established.

In the 1970s, the Leningrad branch of IHST faced the threat of closure and transfer to the Institute of Social Sciences under the Leningrad Regional Committee of the CPSU. Thanks to the intervention of scientists (including V. D. Esakov, head of the Sector on the History of Soviet Culture at the Institute of the History of the USSR), the branch was preserved.

Since 1991, the institute has borne the name of academician Sergei Ivanovich Vavilov.

Directors by year of appointment:

- 1930 — Nikolai Bukharin, Boris Kuznetsov, Valerian Obolensky, until 1938.
- 1944 — Vladimir Komarov
- 1946 — Khachatur Koshtoyants
- 1953 — Alexander Samarin
- 1955 — Ivan Kuznetsov
- 1956 — Nikolai Figurovsky
- 1962 — Bonifaty Kedrov
- 1974 — Semyon Mikulinsky
- 1987 — Vyacheslav Stepin
- 1988 — Nikolai Ustinov
- 1992 — Boris Kozlov
- 1993 — Vladimir Orel
- 2004 — Alexey Postnikov
- 2009 — Vasily Borisov
- 2010 — Yuri Baturin
- 2015 — Dmitry Shcherbinin
- 2021 — Roman Fando

== Structure ==
- St. Petersburg Branch (SPbF IHST RAS; heads: Boris Fedorenko (1953–1955), D.Biol.Sc. P. P. Perfiliev (1956–1962), D.Hist.Sc. A. V. Koltcov (1963–1966, 1972–1973), D.Phil.Sc. Yu. S. Meleshchenko (1967–1972), D.Med.Sc. N. A. Tolokontsev (1973–1975), D.Phil.Sc. B. I. Ivanov (1975–1978), Cand.Eng.Sc. E. P. Karpeev (1978–1987), D.Phil.Sc A. I. Melua (1987–1995), D.Phil.Sc. E. I. Kolchinsky (1995–2015), since 2015 — Cand.Soc.Sc. N. A. Ashcheulova).
- Since 2010, the Exhibition Center of the RAS has been a branch. The center organizes exhibitions of completed works by RAS institutions and the results of the most interesting fundamental research at Russian and international exhibitions in Russia, as well as exhibitions of works by the Russian Academy of Sciences at foreign exhibitions organized by Russian ministries and agencies, foreign companies, and organizations.

Journals:

- Studies in the History of Science and Technology (VIET)
- Studies in the History of Biology (since 2009, quarterly)

Yearbooks:

- Historico-Mathematical Research (since 1948)
- Research on the History of Physics and Mechanics (since 1986)
- Historico-Astronomical Research (since 1955).

Councils

The institute has several dissertation councils in the specialty "history of science and technology".

IHST holds annual conferences on the history of science and technology in Moscow and St. Petersburg. The institute hosts several regular Moscow-wide seminars—on the history of astronomy, the history of physics and mechanics, and the history of the Soviet atomic project.

In 2004, the Academic Council and the Council of Young Scientists of IHST RAS established the "Alexey Karimov Memorial Prize", awarded to young scientists of the institute for significant contributions to the study of the history of science and technology.

Structure

- Department of the History of Technology and Technical Sciences
- Department of the History of Physical and Mathematical Sciences
- Center for the History of the Organization of Science and Science Studies (CHONS)
- Ecological Center
- Center for the History of Socio-Cultural Problems of Science and Technology
- Department of Historiography and Source Studies of the History of Science and Technology
- Department of Methodological and Social Problems of the Development of Science
- Department of the History of Chemical and Biological Sciences
- Department of the History of Earth Sciences
- Chair of the History of Science and Technology
- Editorial Board of the journal "Voprosy istorii estestvoznaniia i tekhniki" (Studies in the History of Science and Technology)
- Laboratory of Scientific and Applied Photography and Cinematography
- Center for Virtual History of Science and Technology (CVHST)
- Problem Group for the Study of Central Asia — P. K. Kozlov Museum
- Sociological and Science Studies Center
- Sector on the History of the Academy of Sciences and Scientific Institutions
- Sector on the History of Evolutionary Theory and Ecology
- Sector on the History of Technical Sciences and Engineering Activities.

== Scientific Events ==
- Annual International Conferences on the history of science.
- History of Science: Sources, Monuments, Heritage Conferences
- International Scientific Conference "Engineering Technologies and Informatics"
- International Scientific-Practical Conference "History of Science and Technology. Museum Studies"
- All-Russian Scientific-Practical Conference with International Participation "Sustainable Development of Mountain Territories: History and Prerequisites for Optimizing Nature Management".

== Literature ==
- Loren R. Graham (1993) Science in Russia and the Soviet Union: A Short History. P. 140.
- Naomi Oreskes, John Krige (2014) Science and Technology in the Global Cold War. P. 412.
- Vaganov A. (2012) Continuity and Legal Succession. Who Needs the History of Science and Technology Today and Why // Nezavisimaya Gazeta, February 22, 2012
- The Historical-Scientific Community in Leningrad — St. Petersburg in 1950–2010: On the 60th Anniversary of the St. Petersburg Branch of the S. I. Vavilov Institute for the History of Science and Technology, RAS. St. Petersburg: Nestor-History, 2013. — 448 pp., ill.
