= Boris Kuznetsov =

Boris Kuznetsov may refer to:

- Boris Kuznetsov (philosopher) (1903–1984)
- Boris Kuznetsov (footballer, born 1928) (1928–1999), Soviet football player who represented USSR internationally in the 1950s
- Boris Kuznetsov (politician) (1935–2013), Russian politician
- Boris Kuznetsov (lawyer) (born 1944), Russian lawyer
- Boris Kuznetsov (boxer) (1947–2006), Soviet boxer
- Boris Kuznetsov (athlete) (born 1947), Soviet long-distance runner
- Boris Kuznetsov (footballer, born 1957), Soviet and Russian footballer for FC Spartak Moscow, PFC CSKA Moscow and FC Lokomotiv Moscow
