= Sergey Kara-Murza =

Russian chemist, historian and political scientist (1939–2025)

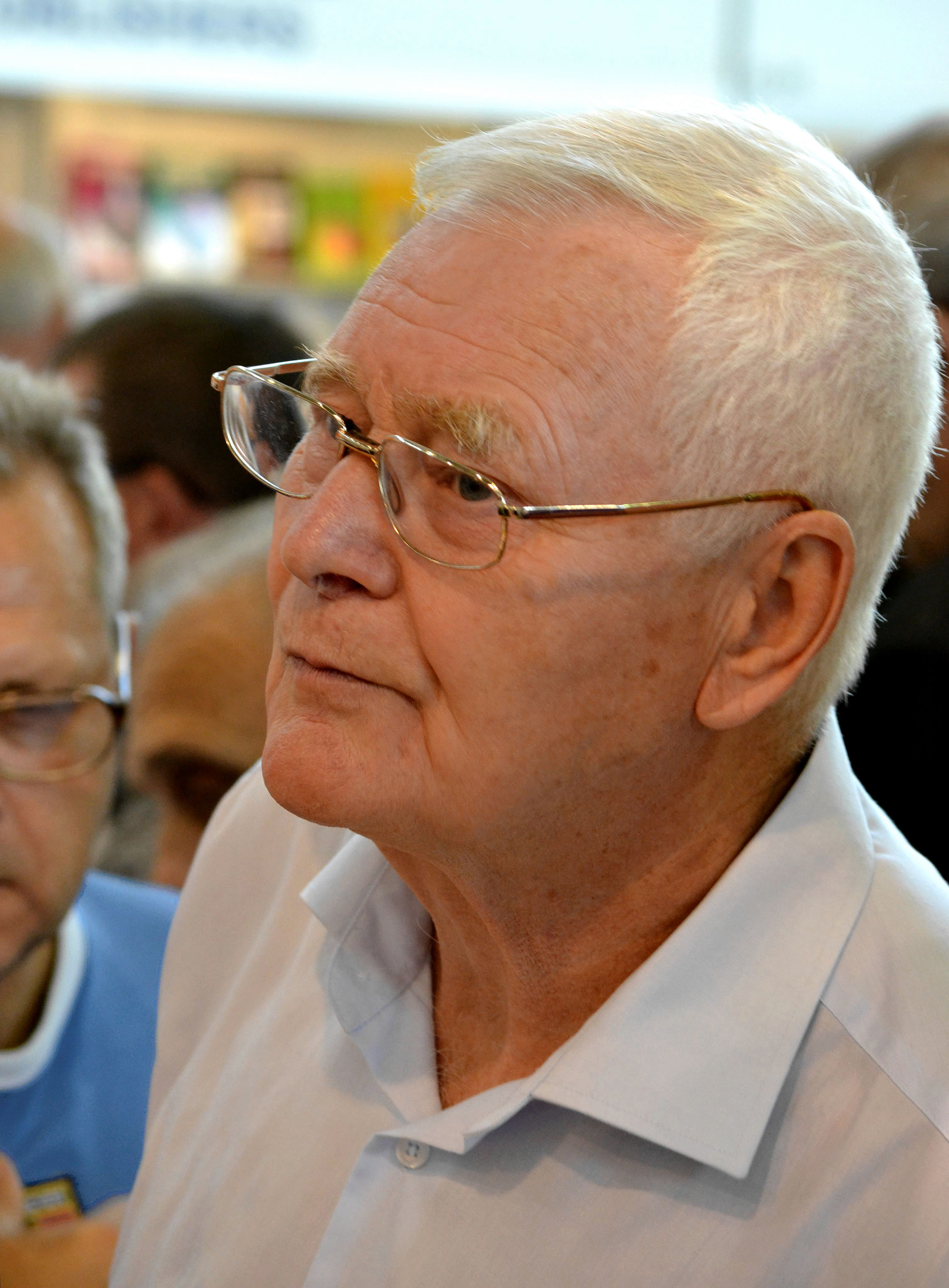
Kara-Murza in 2014

Sergey Georgyevich Kara-Murza (Russian: Сергей Георгиевич Кара-Мурза; 23 January 1939 in Moscow – 18 October 2025) was a Soviet and Russian chemist, historian, political philosopher and sociologist. Doctor of Sciences in Chemical Sciences (1983), and professor (1988). He was the chief researcher of the Institute of Socio-Political Research. He was a professor at the MSU Faculty of Political Science. He was the Deputy Director of the S.I. Vavilov Institute for the History of Science and Technology RAS. He also directed the Center for the Study of Crisis Society. He is the author of the book Soviet Civilization.

== Life and career ==
His mother was from Semirechye. When he was in the fifth grade of school, he was awarded a trip to Artek. He graduated in chemistry from Moscow State University in 1961 (MSU Faculty of Chemistry). He was a volunteer in the Virgin Lands campaign. In 1966 he defended his Candidat dissertation. Between 1966 and 1972 he worked as a Soviet chemical specialist in Cuba. After working in Cuba, he shifted to the humanities (studied issues of science policy).

In 1968–1990 he worked at the S.I. Vavilov Institute for the History of Science and Technology RAS. In 1983 Kara-Murza defended his doctoral thesis in history of science and technology and in 1988 became a professor.

Kara-Murza taught in Russia and Spain and authored several publications and academic studies dedicated to history, science and society.

His most prominent works were Mind Manipulations, published in 2000, and dedicated to establishing and describing the problem of manipulation of public opinion by pro-Western mass media in Russia; and Soviet Civilization, a work about history, political and economic organization of the USSR. In the late 1990s and early 2000s Sergey Kara-Murza wrote a number of political and philosophical works on Eurocentrism, Globalization and Color revolutions. His articles were frequent in left-wing/nationalist Russian newspapers such as Pravda, Alexander Prokhanov's Zavtra and Soviet Russia. He has also published in Literaturnaya gazeta, Nash Sovremennik, Russkiy Dom. He was a member of the Union of Writers of Russia.

== Political views ==
He was greatly influenced by Maxim Gorky.

Kara-Murza became known for his anti-globalization, anti-liberal and anti-Westernist views; however, he also rejected traditional Marxist ideology. He sharply criticized the Russian economic reforms of the 1990s; he was in favor of a more collectivist economy. Having supported President Putin's policies he was opposed to 'color revolutions'.

His theory that the golden billion, the population of the most developed countries (including the poor) lives off the rest of humanity, is popular in the Russian-speaking world. He also recognized the Dulles' Plan.

He criticized Prokhanov and Kurginyan. Vladimir Menshov described Sergey Kara-Murza as a "deep thinker", and "irresistibly logical".

His works were recommended by Aleksandr Dugin.

== Personal life and death ==
Kara-Murza was related to Vladimir A. Kara-Murza and Vladimir V. Kara-Murza, via his grandfather, Sergey Georgyevich Kara-Murza.

According to his son, Kara-Murza died on the night of 17–18 October 2025. Zyuganov published his obituary.

Sergey Kara-Murza is buried at the Khovanskoye Cemetery.

== Summaries ==
The books of his listed below have been reprinted many times. These books were also bestsellers.

=== Manipulation of Consciousness (2000) ===
Kara-Murza's magnum opus. The author demonstrated the extent to which external factors influence the psychology of society.

=== Soviet Civilization (2001) ===
Another landmark work by the philosopher. This is an outline of the history of the USSR. The book was included by Eksmo Publishing House in the book series “Classics of Russian Thought”.

=== Lost Mind (2005) ===
One of the author's fundamental publicistic works. The author reflects on the state of contemporary Russian society, and also criticizes the ideas of the Enlightenment and European civilization.

=== The Dismantlement of a People (2007) ===
The book is dedicated to the crisis in Russia over the last few decades.
