= Golden billion =

Conspiracy theory

The Golden Billion (Russian: золотой миллиард, romanized: zolotoy milliard) is a conspiracy theory that a cabal of global elites are pulling strings to amass wealth for the world's richest billion people at the expense of the rest of humanity. It is a popular term in the Russian-speaking world.

The term was coined by Anatoly Tsikunov (writing as A. Kuzmich) in his articles in the late 1980s and the early 1990s. They were assembled in 1994 in the book The Plot of World Government: Russia and the Golden Billion. The term was popularized by Russian nationalist and writer Sergey Kara-Murza.

== Details ==
According to Kara-Murza, the majority of all resources on the planet are consumed by the top billion people, which is referred to as the 'Golden Billion'. He alleges that the 'Golden Billion' is a term used by Western elites, which means a synthesis of western concept of "Golden Age" of progress and prosperity and pessimistic recognition of the limited resources of the Earth and the impossibility of extending this prosperity to the entire current population of the planet.

Kara-Murza posits that at the Earth Summit a conclusion was reached that resources would be sufficient only for near term needs of the population of the West, he claims that the expert community knows the conclusion well and never disputes it but keeps it silent. Among other sources Kara-Murza used to demonstrate that Western elites are very concerned about resources were The Limits to Growth and articles by David Pimentel.

In the article which popularized the term, "Концепция "золотого миллиарда" и Новый мировой порядок", (Note: "The concept of the "golden billion" and the New World Order") Kara-Murza alludes to the concept of a New World Order, a conspiracy theory associated with antisemitic tropes. Additionally, the term "мировой элиты" is used, which translates to "world elite" and has associations with other antisemitic conspiracies.

According to Kara-Murza, in Russia it was Tsikunov who formulated the main idea of the “Golden Billion”: developed countries maintain high levels of consumption for their citizens, and endorse political, military and economic measures designed to keep the rest of the world in an undeveloped state and as a raw-material appendage area for the dumping of hazardous waste and as a source of cheap labor.

In his 1990 article, Tsikunov argued that there were only resources for one billion people, and by year 2000 due technological progress the world would be able to sustain only 2 billion people, for this reason Western countries want to control Russia's resources due to lack of their own. For those people outside of sustainable 2 billion population, according to Tsikunov, there were plans by Western elites for artificial population reduction, and the people in developing countries outside sustainable population would be limited in their use of resources to subsistence levels, while only Westerners would be able to enjoy full material well-being. In his opinion, reforms in the late USSR were imposed by Western elites to limit use of resources in Russia, with the ultimate goal of their actions was the creation of a centralized totalitarian World Government by 2005. To support his conspiracy theory, he used incorrect citations of documents from the UN, the International Monetary Fund, the World Bank, and completely non-existent documents.

Kara-Murza, following Tsikunov, in turn claims that the West is waging a hot and cold war against Russia for resources. He posits that due to policies allegedly imposed by Western elites, Russia's population would decrease by two-thirds.

Russian proponents of the Golden billion theory and even officials cite invented quote by former British Prime Minister Margaret Thatcher, falsely claiming she said it would be “economically feasible for only 15 million people to live in Russia".

The theory follows ideas of Thomas Malthus, a Russocentric extension of Malthus' emphasis on the scarcity of natural resources. A key change being that Malthus was mostly concerned with finite global crop yields, proponents of a "golden billion" are mostly concerned with finite natural resources such as fossil fuels and metal.

== Counter-arguments ==
Available data indicates that many countries are approaching consumption levels of developed countries.

Modern estimates indicate that mineral shortages are not a threat. Resource usage trend analysis finds no imminent problems. Various economic studies of price trends since 1979 did not reveal resource exhaustion.

Joel E. Cohen says that median estimation of all studies of limits to world population is 7.7 billion people, given current technology (at the time of estimation).

In his book The Ultimate Resource, Julian Simon claimed that scarcity of physical resources can be overcome by human ingenuity. For example, the argument of oil scarcity could be overcome by energy development, such as use of synthetic fuels.

== Application to the Russian invasion of Ukraine ==
During Russia's 2022 invasion of Ukraine, the concept has been used by leading Russian politicians including Vladimir Putin to justify the military invasion. In May 2022, Nikolai Patrushev, secretary of the Security Council, accused "Anglo-Saxons" (Note: (a term colloquialized to refer to the United States and United Kingdom)), of "hiding their actions behind the human rights, freedom and democracy rhetoric," while pushing ahead "with the ‘golden billion’ doctrine," which implies that only select few are entitled to prosperity in this world".

In June 2022, speaking at the International Economic Forum, Vladimir Putin "reiterated his position that the Kremlin was 'forced' to initiate the invasion of Ukraine [...] 'Our colleagues do not simply deny reality,' Putin added. 'They are trying to resist the course of history. They think in terms of the last century. They are in captivity of their own delusions about countries outside of the so-called golden billion, they see everything else as the periphery, their backyard, they treat these places as their colonies, and they treat the peoples living there as second-class citizens, because they consider themselves to be exceptional.'”

== General use in Russia ==
The conspiracy theory is widely used by the Russian authorities. For example, in 2000, Vladimir Putin used the expression "golden billion" to explain the difference between the rich "Global North" and the poor "Global South" to participants in the Asia Pacific Economic Cooperation (APEC) summit. In 2022, Vladimir Putin cited this conspiracy theory to explain the introduction of sanctions against Russia that year, which were in fact introduced due to Russia's invasion of Ukraine. The conspiracy theory of the "golden billion" was used in speeches by Mikhail Kovalchuk, Dmitry Medvedev, Nikolay Patrushev and Sergey Lavrov. Putin and the aforementioned officials attribute a unified will to the "golden billion", and that allegedly some secret forces deliberately arranged for one part of the countries to remain in humiliating poverty.

== See also ==
Conspiracy theories

- Dulles' Plan
- New World Order

Other concepts

- Dependency theory
- Economic inequality
- First World
- Global North and Global South
- Theories of imperialism
