= Galina Matvievskaya =

Soviet historian (1930-2025)

- Галина Павловна Матвиевская
- Born: 13 July 1930; Dnipropetrovsk, Ukrainian SSR, Soviet Union
- Died: 30 January 2025 (aged 94); Orenburg, Orenburg Oblast, Russia
- Occupation: Historian
- Awards: Full member of the Academy of Sciences of Uzbekistan (2000)

Academic background
- Education: Leningrad State University; Institute for the History of Science and Technology
- Doctoral advisor: Sagdy Sirazhdinov

Academic work
- Discipline: History of science
- Sub-discipline: History of mathematics; Islamic Golden Age
- Institutions: Institute of Mathematics; Orenburg State Pedagogical University

Galina Pavlovna Matvievskaya (Russian: Галина Павловна Матвиевская; 13 July 1930 – 30 January 2025) was a Soviet historian. She specialized in the history of mathematics, writing several books related to the Islamic Golden Age.

== Biography ==
Matvievskaya was born on 13 July 1930 in Dnipropetrovsk to Ukrainian parents, historian Pavlo Matvievskiy and museum curator Kseniya Hololobova. Her grandfather Yakob Gololobov was a politician who served as governor of Volhynia and Yenisey Governorates.

Matvievskaya was raised in Kharkiv and, after the outbreak of the German–Soviet War, in Chlakov (now Orenburg). After graduating with a high school gold medal in 1948, she graduated from Leningrad State University in the Faculty of Mathematics and Mechanics in 1954 and studied at the Institute for the History of Science and Technology of the Academy of Sciences of the Soviet Union, defending her Candidate of Physical and Mathematical Sciences dissertation in 1959. She successfully defended her doctoral dissertation in 1968, and received her doctorate in physical and mathematical sciences in 1969; her dissertation advisor was Sagdy Sirazhdinov.

In 1959, Matvievskaya joined the Institute of Mathematics of the Academy of Sciences of the Uzbek SSR (AN-USSR). She served as head of the Department of Algebra and Mathematical Analysis from 1980 until 1985, before serving as chief research fellow from 1985 until 1994. In 1994, Matvievskaya moved to Orenburg State Pedagogical University to become a professor at their Department of Algebra, Geometry and History of Mathematics.

Matvievskaya specialized in the history of science, particularly in mathematics. Her studies include unpublished number theory manuscripts from Leonhard Euler, as well as medieval Arabic manuscripts involving mathematics. She also wrote several books about the Islamic Golden Age mathematicians al-Biruni, al-Khwarizmi, and Abd al-Rahman al-Sufi, as well as people like Vladimir Dal, René Descartes, Albrecht Dürer, Petrus Ramus, Ulugh Beg, and Vsevolod Romanovsky. She and Boris Rosenfeld co-edited a catalog of Arabic manuscripts on topics like mathematics and astronomy. Her research also focused on the history of science in her native Orenburg, with some of her books on the topic. She joined the Union of Writers of Russia in 2000.

Matvievskaya won the State Prize of the Uzbek SSR in 1974, and was later titled Honoured Scientist of the Uzbek SSR in 1980 for services to promoting the work of Islamic mathematicians. In 1984, she was elected a corresponding member of the AN-USSR. She became a corresponding member of the International Academy of the History of Science in 1995. In 2000, she was elected full member of the Academy of Sciences of Uzbekistan. She won the Orenburg Lyre Prize in 2002 and 2011. She was awarded the 2005 All-Russian Pushkin Literature Prize for "outstanding contribution to literary studies and promotion of the historical heritage of the native land". She was titled Honorary Worker of Higher Vocational Education in 2010.

Matvievskaya died on 30 January 2025 in Orenburg; she was 94.

== Works ==
- The Doctrine of Number in the Medieval Near and Middle East (1967)
- The Development of the Doctrine of Number in Europe before the 17th Century (1971)
- René Descartes (1976)
- Albrecht Dürer — Scientist (1987)
- Essays on the History of Trigonometry: Ancient Greece, Medieval East, Late Middle Ages (1990)
- Abd ar-Rahman al-Sufi (1999)
- Vladimir Ivanovich Dal (2002, as co-author)
- Yakov Vladimirovich Khanykov (2006)
- Vladimir Ivanovich Dal in Orenburg (2007, as co-author)
- The Life and Work of P. I. Rychkov: In 4 volumes (2008-2012)
- Ramus: 1515–1572 (2013)
- Calendar of significant and memorable dates in the Orenburg region for 2015 (2014, as co-author)
