= Soviet Civilization =

2001 collection of writings by Sergei Kara-Murza

Soviet civilization
- Author: Sergei Kara-Murza
- Original title: Russian: Советская цивилизация
- Language: Russian
- Publisher: Algoritm
- Publication date: 2001
- Publication place: Russia
- Media type: Print (hardback)

Soviet Civilization (Russian: Советская цивилизация) is a 2001 collection of writings by Russian author Sergei Kara-Murza. The book was a bestseller.

The book was included by Eksmo Publishing House in the book series “Classics of Russian Thought”.

== Description ==
The author's opus magnum, the book has gone through several reprints. The author himself considered it his best work. The book is permeated with anti-Western sentiments and bitterness over the collapse of the “Soviet [social] order”. The author speaks highly of the Soviet Union. The author criticizes elements of Eurocentrism in Lenin's thought.

== Criticism ==
The book was criticized by Mikhail Veller, calling it a lie.

== Influence ==
This and his other book, Manipulation of Consciousness, influenced the writer Zakhar Prilepin.

== See also ==
- Soviet empire
- Exit Stalin: The Soviet Union as a Civilization, 1953-1991
