= Nobel Monument =

Monument in New York City

Coordinates: 40°46′55″N 73°58′31″W

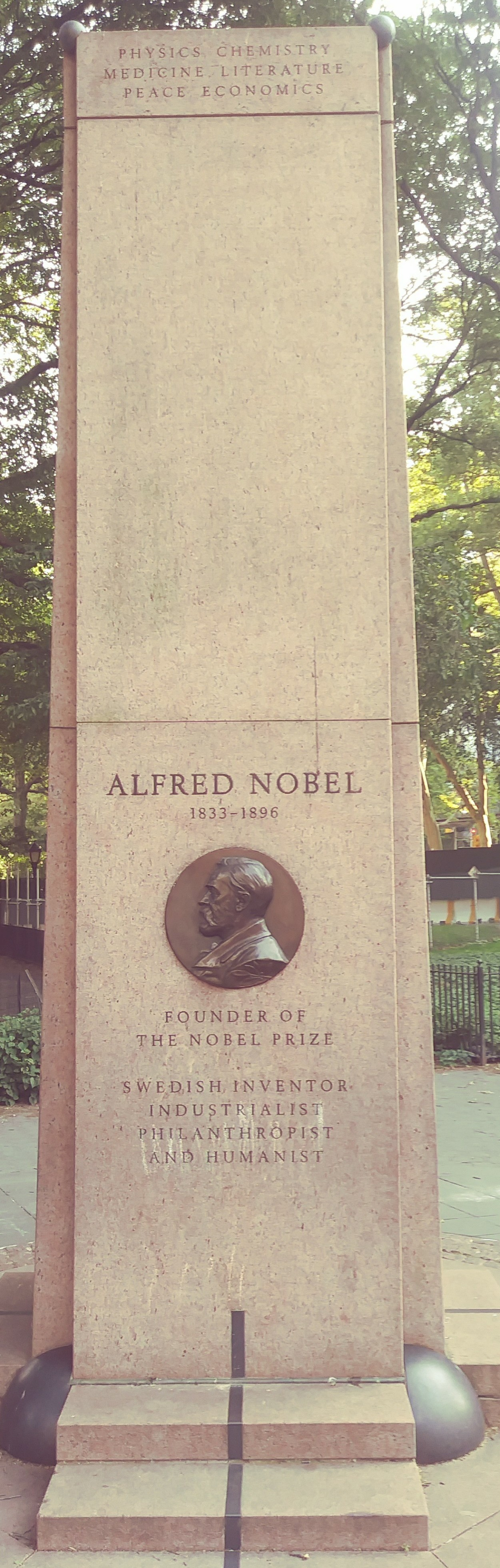
The north face honors Alfred Nobel

The Nobel Monument is a four-sided stele in honor of U.S. Nobel laureates, located just northwest of the American Museum of Natural History in Theodore Roosevelt Park on the Upper West Side of Manhattan, New York City. The names of U.S. laureates of the Nobel Prize are engraved on its western, southern, and eastern sides, and the name and image of Alfred Nobel on the north side. It is the only monument in a New York City park which bears the names of living people.

The monument was originally planned to be installed in front of the New York State Memorial to Theodore Roosevelt on the east side of the museum, but it was relocated due to opposition. The monument was dedicated in 2003. The west side of the monument lists Nobel laureates up to 1979, the south side continues the list through 2010, and the east side lists the laureates starting in 2011 (as can be seen in the photos in the gallery of images below, although as of November 2023 and since at least August 2019 the website of the New York City Department of Parks has incorrectly stated that the south side lists the names from 1980 to the present).

The monument lists only those laureates who were U.S. citizens when they won the Nobel, so it includes naturalized immigrants such as author Isaac Bashevis Singer and chemist Roald Hoffman but has neither U.S. native T. S. Eliot, who was a naturalized British subject when he won, nor Albert Einstein, who only became a U.S. citizen years after winning. In addition to individuals it also names the American Friends Service Committee (AFSC), a Quaker organization based in the US, which won the Nobel Peace Prize (the only Nobel that groups as well as individuals can win) in 1947; the AFSC's name can be seen in the photograph below of the west side of the monument.

For over 20 years Nicholas Carollo has been etching these names into the monument. Nicholas Carollo is 85 years old and has worked for over 45 years in the stone engraving business.

== Images of other sides of the Nobel Monument ==
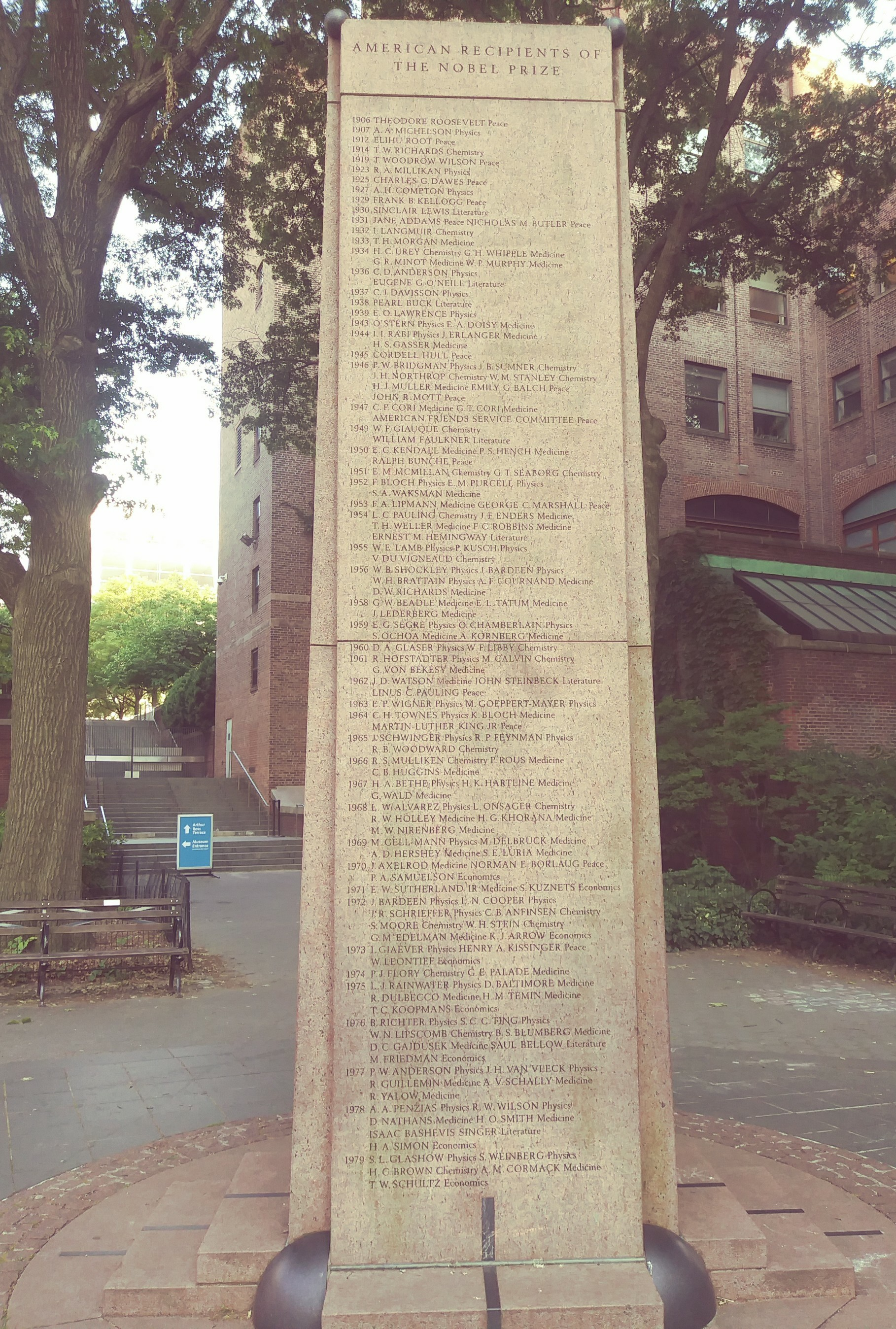
The west face lists US laureates up to 1979; the museum is in the background

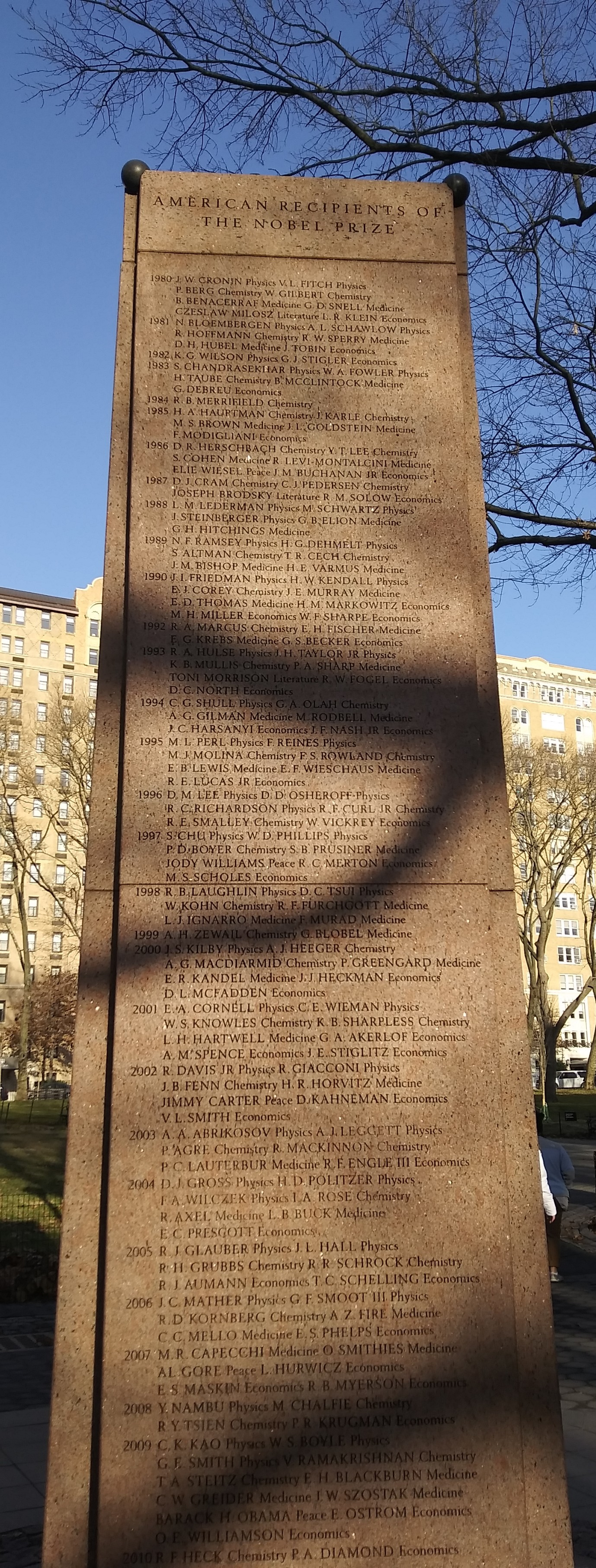
The south side: laureates 1980-2010

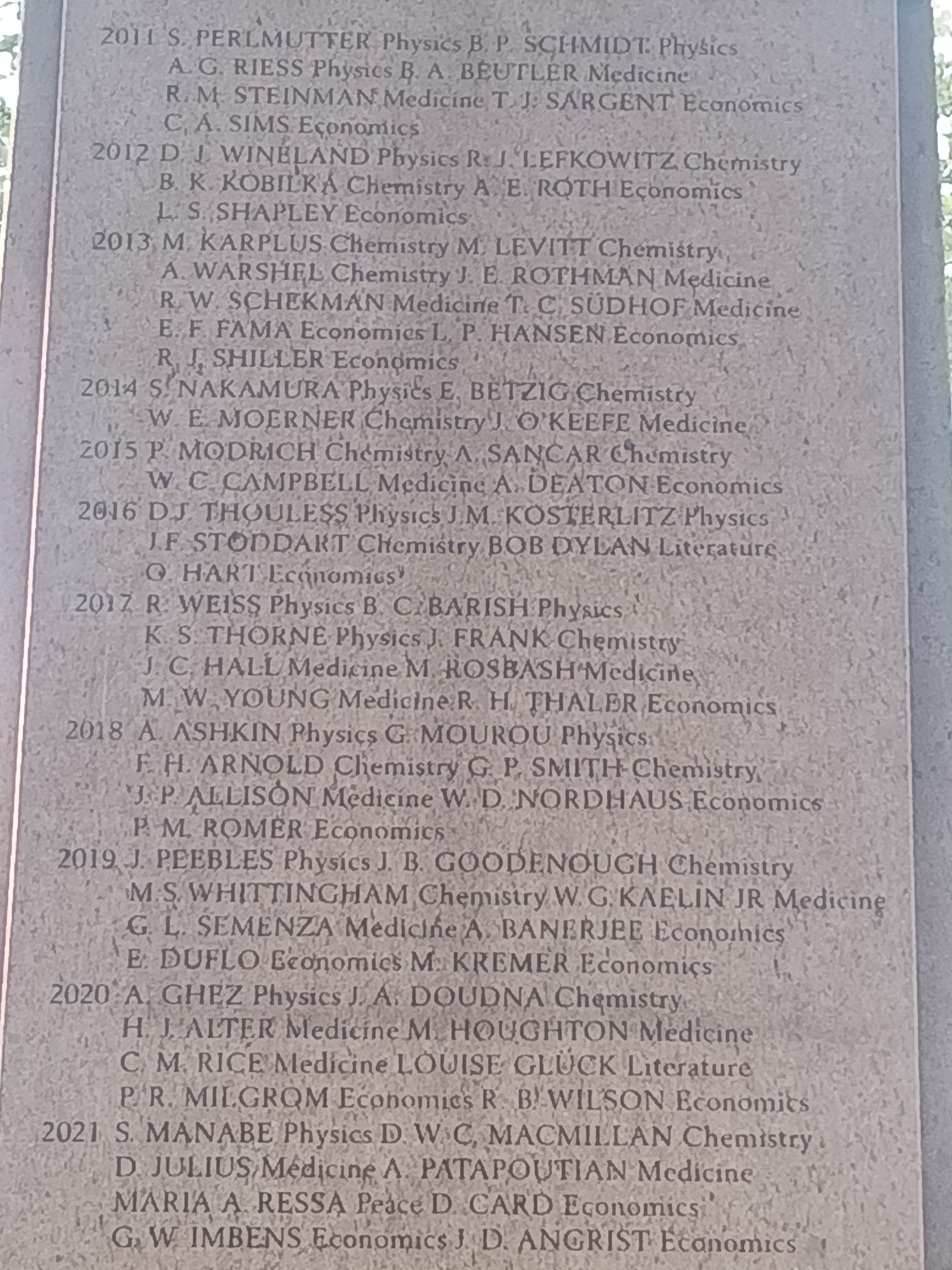
The east side: laureates 2011-2021

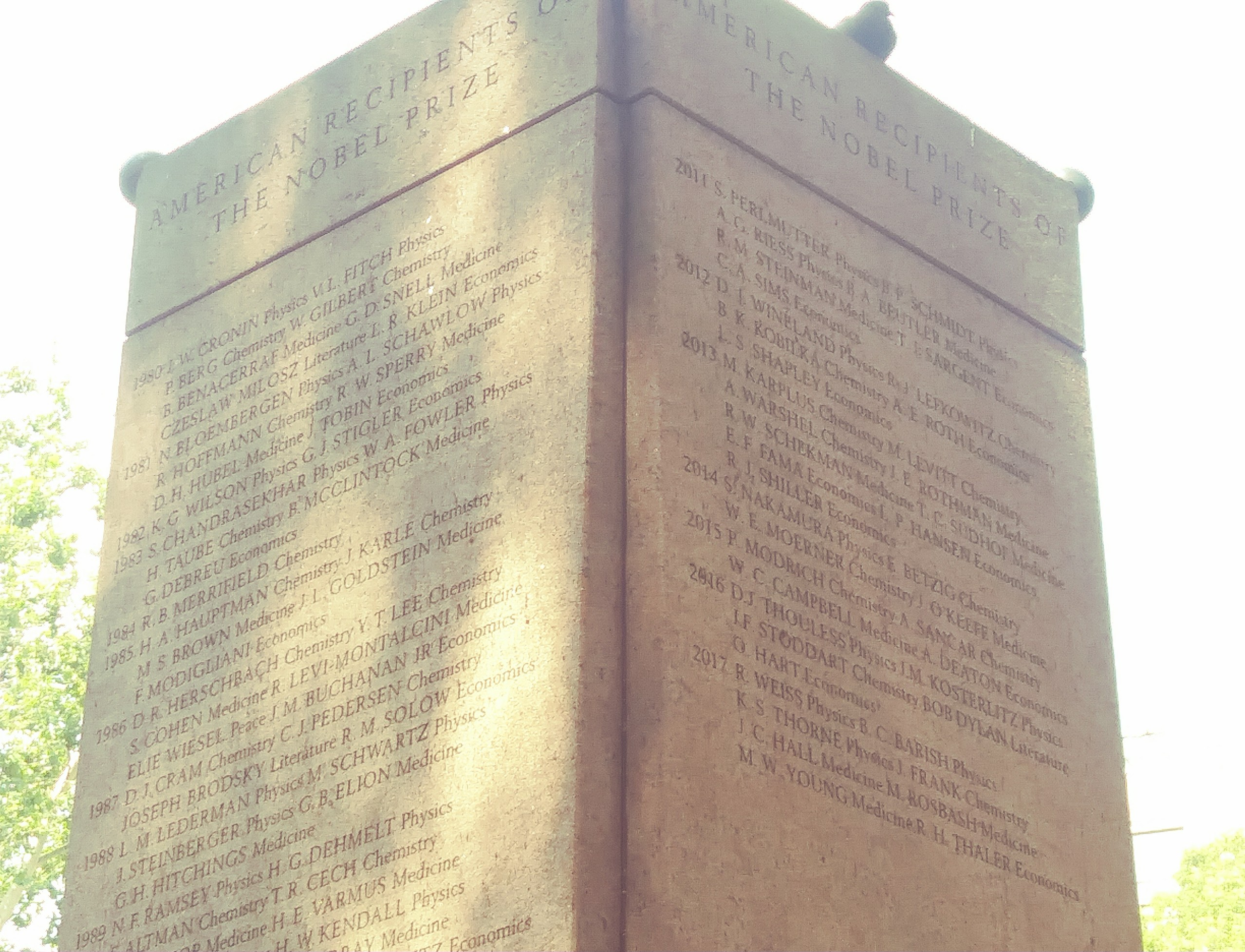
The top of the monument, showing the east and south sides
