= François Magendie =

French physiologist

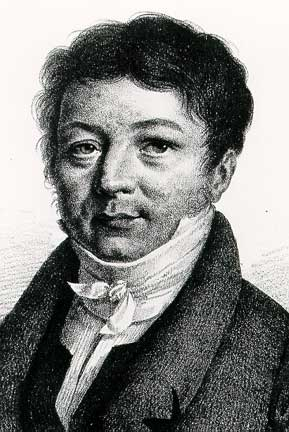
- François Magendie in 1822
- Born: 6 October 1783; Bordeaux, France
- Died: 7 October 1855 (aged 72); Sannois, France
- Known for: Foramen of Magendie Bell-Magendie law
- Scientific career
- Fields: Physiology
- Workplaces: Collège de France

François Magendie (6 October 1783 – 7 October 1855) was a French physiologist, considered a pioneer of experimental physiology. He is known for describing the foramen of Magendie. There is also a Magendie sign, a downward and inward rotation of the eye due to a lesion in the cerebellum. Magendie was a member of the faculty at the College of France, holding the Chair of Medicine from 1830 to 1855 (he was succeeded by Claude Bernard, who worked previously as his assistant).

In 1816 he published Précis élementaire de Physiologie which described an experiment first illustrating the concept of empty calories:

I took a dog of three years old, fat, and in good health, and put it to feed upon sugar alone... It expired the 32nd day of the experiment.

His most important contribution to science was also his most disputed. Contemporaneous to Sir Charles Bell, Magendie conducted a number of experiments on the nervous system, in particular verifying the differentiation between sensory and motor nerves in the spinal cord, the so-called Bell–Magendie law. This led to an intense rivalry, with the British claiming that Bell published his discoveries first and that Magendie stole his experiments. The intensity of this scientific rivalry perhaps can only be compared to that between Isaac Newton and Robert Hooke.

Magendie was also a notorious vivisector, shocking even many of his contemporaries with the live dissections that he performed at public lectures in physiology. Richard Martin, an Irish MP, in introducing his famous bill banning animal cruelty in the United Kingdom, described Magendie's public dissection of a greyhound, in which the beast was nailed down ear and paw, half the nerves of its face dissected then left overnight for further dissection, calling Magendie a "disgrace to Society." There was a belief among British physicians, even those who defended animal experimentation, that Magendie purposely subjected his experimental animals to needless torture. A Quaker once visited him, questioning him about vivisection; according to Anne Fagot-Largeault's inaugural lesson at the College of France, he responded with much patience, arguing the reasons of animal experimentation. Besides drawing sharp criticism from contemporaries in both Britain and France, Magendie's methods were later criticized by, among others, Charles Darwin and Thomas Henry Huxley.

Colin White credits to Magendie the earliest version of the phrase "Lies, damned lies, and statistics". While arguing against using blood-letting to treat fever, and confronted with statistical numbers he believed to be manufactured, Magendie stated: "Thus the alteration of the truth which is already manifesting itself in the progressive form of lying and perjury, offers us, in the superlative, the statistics."

== Works ==
- Vorschriften für die Bereitung und Anwendung einiger neuen Arzneimittel als der Krähenaugen, des Morphins, der Blausäure ... der Jodine u. m. a. : a. d. Franz . Leop. Voß, Leipzig 1822 Digital edition / 1823 Digital edition / 1831 Digital edition by the University and State Library Düsseldorf
- Formulary for the preparation and mode of employing several new remedies . (2 volumes) Underwood, London 1824. Digital edition by the University and State Library Düsseldorf
- A Formulary for the Preparation and medical : administration of certain new Remedies / François Magendie. Transl. from the French of M. Magendie, with Annotations and additional Articles by James Manby Gully . Churchill, London 1835. Digital edition by the University and State Library Düsseldorf

== Footnotes ==
- Sourkes, Theodore L (March 2002). "Magendie and the chemists: the earliest chemical analyses of the cerebrospinal fluid". Journal of the History of the Neurosciences. 11 (1): 2–10. doi:10.1076/jhin.11.1.2.9109. PMID 12012572. S2CID 12853527.
- Haas, L F (June 1994). "François Magendie (1783-1855)". J. Neurol. Neurosurg. Psychiatry. 57 (6): 692. doi:10.1136/jnnp.57.6.692. PMC 1072971. PMID 8006648.
- Saavedra-Delgado, A M (1991). "François Magendie on anaphylaxis (1839)". Allergy and Asthma Proceedings. 12 (5): 355–6. doi:10.2500/108854191778879160. PMID 1959774.
- Bloch, H (October 1989). "Francois Magendie, Claude Bernard, and the interrelation of science, history, and philosophy". South. Med. J. 82 (10): 1259–61. doi:10.1097/00007611-198910000-00013. PMID 2678501.
- Shampo, M A; Kyle R A (May 1987). "François Magendie: early French physiologist". Mayo Clin. Proc. 62 (5): 412. doi:10.1016/s0025-6196(12)65446-9. PMID 3553755.
- Rice, G (April 1987). "The Bell–Magendie–Walker controversy". Medical History. 31 (2): 190–200. doi:10.1017/s0025727300046561. PMC 1139711. PMID 3550329.
- Lazorthes, G; Campan L (1984). "[François Magendie (1783-1855)]". Bull. Acad. Natl. Med. 168 (1–2): 105–11. PMID 6383530.
- Breathnach, C S (November 1983). "Biographical sketches No. 34--Magendie". Irish Medical Journal. 76 (11): 471. PMID 6358120.
- Gallistel, C R (April 1981). "Bell, Magendie, and the proposals to restrict the use of animals in neurobehavioral research". The American Psychologist. 36 (4): 357–60. doi:10.1037/0003-066X.36.4.357. PMID 7023302.
- Albury, W R (1977). "Experiment and explanation in the physiology of Bichat and Magendie". Studies in History of Biology. 1: 47–131. PMID 11609978.
- Gans, H (October 1972). "An early example of the use of surgical techniques in solving a physiologic problem (Francois Magendie)". Surgery, Gynecology & Obstetrics. 135 (4): 616–22. PMID 4562124.
- Schiller, F (July 1971). "Magendie on medicine". California Medicine. 115 (1): 98. PMC 1517894. PMID 4327773.
- Poynter, F N (April 1968). "Doctors in The Human Comedy (Guillaume Dupuytren, Jean Baptiste Bouillaud, François Joseph Victor Broussais, François Magendie)". JAMA. 204 (1): 7–10. doi:10.1001/jama.204.1.7. PMID 4867960.
- KARLIK, L N [in Russian] (February 1959). "[Francois Magendie; 175th anniversary of his birth (1783-1855).]". Klinicheskaia Meditsina. 37 (2): 142–7. PMID 13642635.
- FENTON, P F (January 1951). "Francois Magendie (October 6, 1783-October 7, 1855)". J. Nutr. 43 (1): 3–15. doi:10.1093/jn/43.1.1. PMID 14851024.
- White, Colin (December 1964). "Unkind Cuts at Statisticians". The American Statistician. 18 (5): 15–17. doi:10.1080/00031305.1964.10482634. eISSN 1537-2731. ISSN 0003-1305. JSTOR 2682462.
