= Bell–Magendie law =

Finding on spinal nerve fibers

In anatomy and neurophysiology, the Bell-Magendie law is the finding that the anterior spinal nerve roots contain only motor fibers and posterior roots only sensory fibers and that nerve impulses are conducted in only one direction in each case. The nature and the physiology of the phenomena were described independently by the British anatomical scientist Sir Charles Bell and the French physiologist François Magendie, later confirmed by the German physiologist Johannes Peter Müller.

11. Anterior root is responsible for carrying motor signals 12. Posterior root is responsible for sensory information.

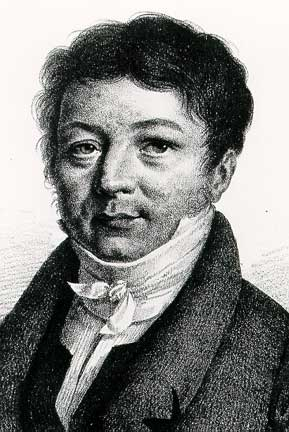
François Magendie

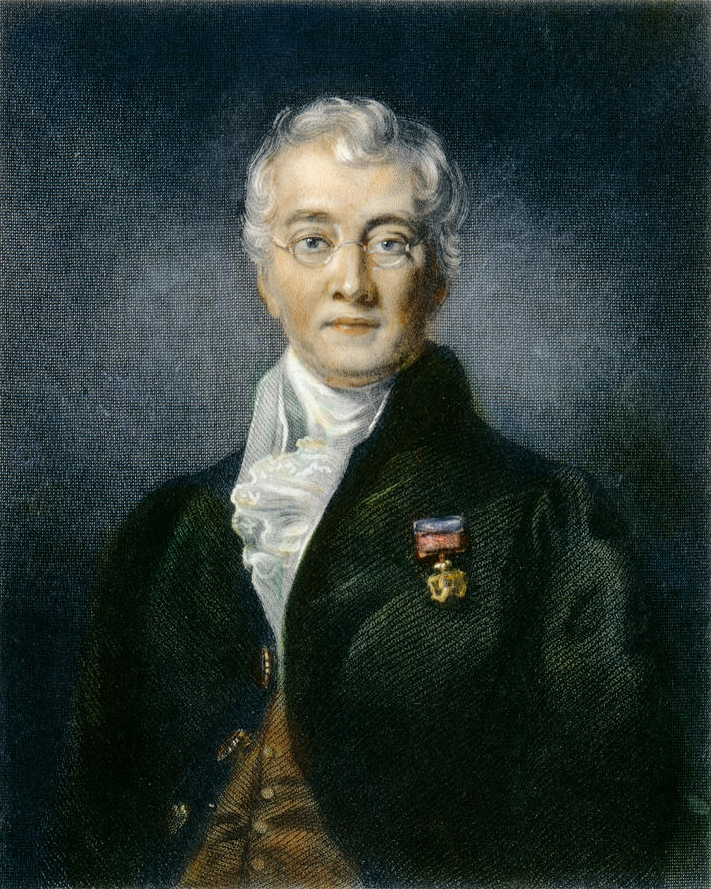
Charles Bell

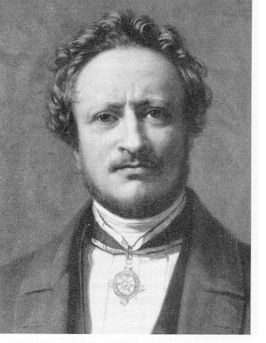
Johannes Peter Müller

== History ==
The findings were described independently by two professors working in different medical paradigms: by Sir Charles Bell an anatomist and Francois Magendie – a pathophysiology and physiology professor . Their independent observations were 11 years apart. Another definitive experimental proof was given nine years after Magendie's experiments by Johannes Peter Müller during a vivisection of a frog in 1831.

=== Bell's discovery ===
In 1811 in a self-sponsored and published pamphlet Charles Bell referred to the motor functions of nerve fibers exiting the ventral roots of the spinal cord but did not mention the sensory functions of the dorsal roots. That was in part because his studies were dissectionist and not vivisectionist; pain is elicited and detected best in a conscious animal. A dead, or rendered unconscious, animal would not produce the desired effect when posterior horn fibers, responsible for sensation and transfer of noxious signals, are stimulated. Bell's nephew, John Shaw travelled in 1812 to Paris where he presented Bell's system to the French anatomists. Reportedly Shaw staged a demonstration on the facial nerves of a donkey without the intended effect.

=== Magendie's puppies experiment ===
Eleven years later, Magendie announced in the magazine Journal de physiologie expérimentale et de pathologie his discovery that the motor neuron fibers exit from the anterior root and the sensory neuron fibers from the dorsal root: "(trans)section of the dorsal root abolishes sensation, (trans)section of ventral roots abolishes motor activity, and (trans)section of both roots abolishes both sensation and motor activity."

Magendie gave the first complete description of the experimental proof of the Bell–Magendie law. His experiments were public, often conducted in the presence of medical students and curious citizens. That particular experiment was conducted by severing the anterior and posterior roots of spinal nerves in different combinations of several dogs in a litter of puppies. Stimulation of the posterior roots caused pain, and stimulation of the anterior – movement. The experiment was criticized for its cruelty by the Paris and London Humane societies. Detailed description of the experiment was published in the same magazine for physiology and pathology.

=== Müller's frog experiment ===
The third scientist, not credited in the name of the law, was the German physician and physiologist Johannes Peter Müller; he carried out neuroanatomical and physiological experiments on rabbits for quite some time and without success .

Then he decided to simplify his experiments, and thus analysis, by reducing the object of the study to a less complex nervous system – that of a frog. He was assisted by then student and later famous German physiologist and anatomist Theodor Schwann.

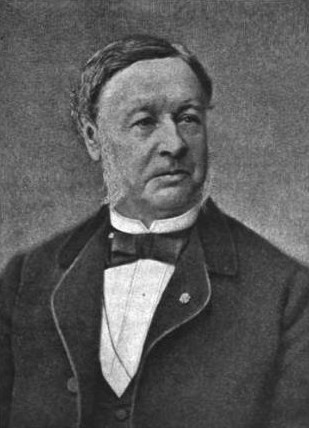
Theodor Schwann

Because the frog spinal cord is relatively simple and easy to remove, and the relationships between the nerve roots are more apparent, Müller could simplify his design, which also resulted in better reproducibility of the experiment. His experiment involved innervations of the hind legs of the frog. One procedure involved first severing the posterior roots of the spinal nerve leading to the leg, with the result that the leg became insensible but not paralyzed. The second part of his experiment involved severing the anterior roots, so that the limb became paralyzed but not insensible. Müller's frog experiment became a physiology professor's favorite – it was an easily reproducible experiment, and has been used widely in teaching neurophysiology.

== The naming controversy ==
The dispute of the findings, and subsequently the naming of the discovery, started with the publication of Magendie's paper in the Journal de physiologie expérimentale et de pathologie. The conflict lasted until Bell's death in 1842. Some science historians have better resolved to name it after both physicians, giving Bell the honorary first mention, although others have claimed that these are essentially two overlapping discoveries. Because of the independent findings of both scientists (Bell's claim over the motor function and Magendie's over the sensory function) and the existing conflict between England and France on the political arena of the 19th century (and prior to that), the debate on the Bell–Magendie law became a matter of national pride. The English medicine professors, especially Bell, and even English politicians rebuked the "crude methods" of the French vivisectionist. English medical staff and faculty were more tuned into seeking anatomical and structural explanations through dissections – taking a sort of medical functionalist approach. The dispute between the two happened in an era of a more secular approach to scientific discovery; positivism had become popular in many sciences. That was at about the same time as the works and theories of Auguste Comte were published.
On the other hand, Magendie was considering himself in his own words "a mere scavenger of science trying to do science by collecting bits and pieces of nature's truths"; he was not after the grand scheme but after the "inventory of the nuts and bolts of the system". The French were also proud with Magendie's many discoveries and the extension of human knowledge in the areas of pathology, physiology and pharmacology and stood firmly behind his claim on the matter. Nevertheless, many Frenchmen would have agreed with the English that the vivisections were not for the faint of heart. Until his death in 1842, Bell would write against the methods of Magendie and in his letters and books he would disapprove of the "protracted cruelty of the dissection experiments" .

== Exceptions ==
The unmyelinated Group C nerve fibers that transmit pain and temperature from the pelvic viscera enter the spinal cord via ventral roots at L5-S3, thus violating the Bell–Magendie law.
