= Vyacheslav Stepin =

Russian philosopher (1934–2018)

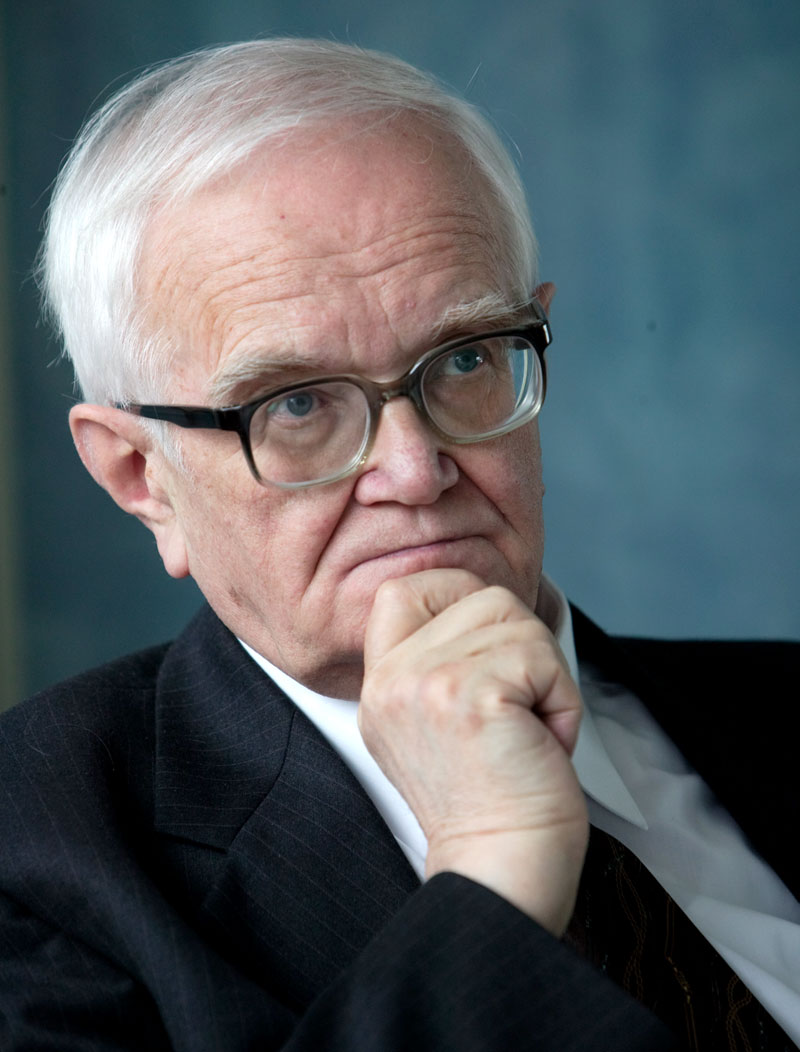
- Born: August 19, 1934; Navlya
- Died: December 14, 2018 (aged 84); Moscow
- Alma mater: Department of Philosophy of the Faculty of History of BSU
- Occupation: Cultural studies scholar
- Employer: Belarusian National Technical University; Belarusian State University; S.I. Vavilov Institute for the History of Science and Technology RAS
- Awards: Order "For Merit to the Fatherland", 4th class (1999); Order of Friendship of Peoples (1986); Medal "In Commemoration of the 850th Anniversary of Moscow"; State Prize of the Russian Federation

Vyacheslav Semyonovich Stepin (Russian: Вячеслав Семёнович Стёпин; 1934, in Bryansk Oblast - 2018, in Moscow) was a Soviet Russian philosopher. Doktor Nauk in Philosophical Sciences, Professor (1979), Academician of the Russian Academy of Sciences (1994). He was director of the Institute of Philosophy, Russian Academy of Sciences (1988–2006).

In 1951 he graduated from school in Minsk. From 1951 to 1956 he studied at the Faculty of History of the Belarusian State University. In 1956–1959, he was a postgraduate student at the Department of Philosophy at the Belarusian State University. From 1959 to 1974, he worked at the Department of Philosophy at the Belarusian National Technical University. In 1965, he received his PhD in philosophy. His dissertation was on positivism. He received the title of Associate Professor in 1972. From 1974 to 1987, he worked at his alma mater. In 1976 he received a Doctor of Philosophy degree. In 1979 he received the title of professor. From 1981 to 1987 he headed the department at his alma mater. He was elected a corresponding member of the Academy of Sciences of the USSR in 1987. He was director of the S. Vavilov Institute for the History of Science and Technology, RAS (1987–1988).
