= Nobel Metamorphoses =

1984 statue in Troisdorf, Germany

Coordinates: 50.81536°N 7.156523°E

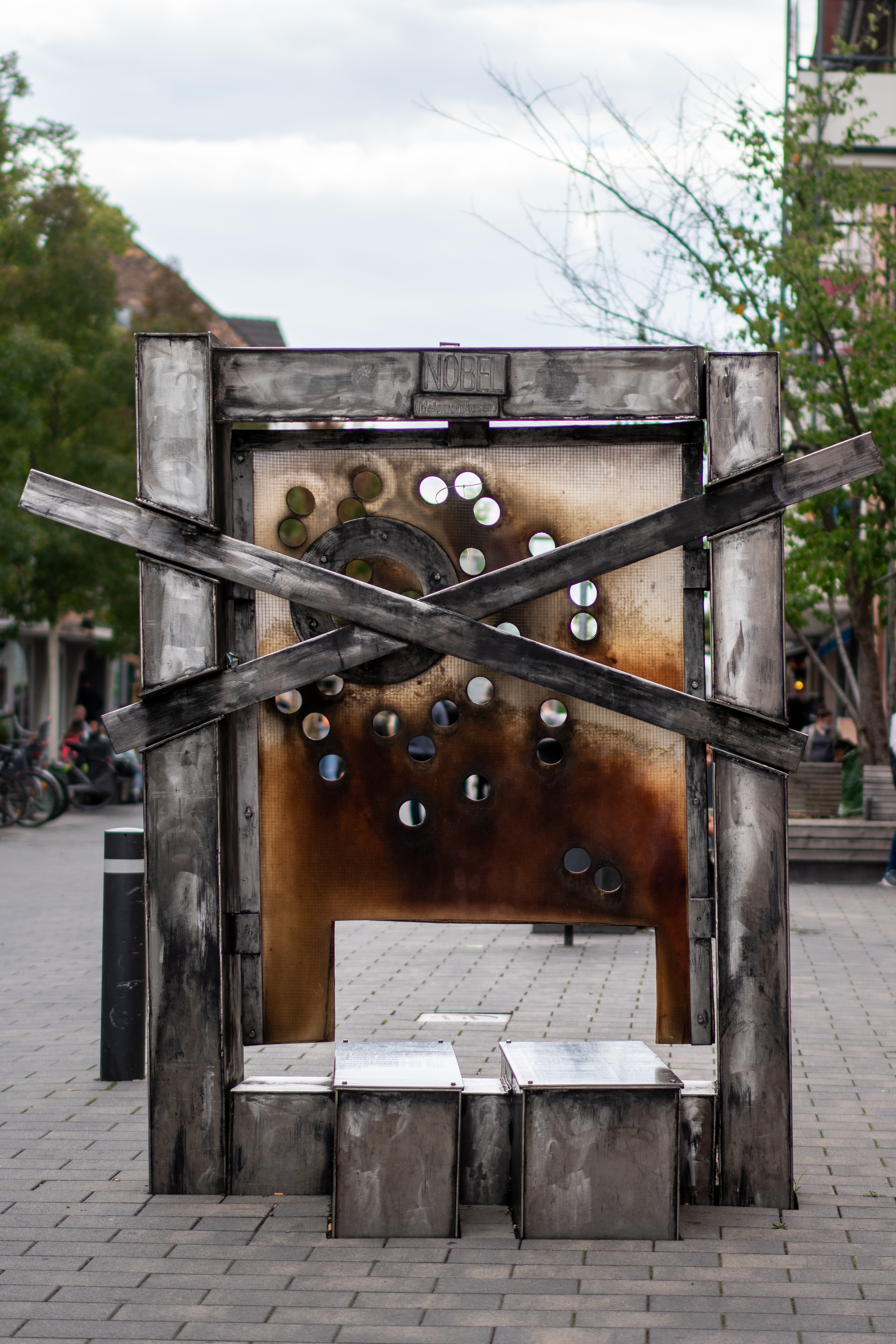
Nobel-Metamorphoen on Alfred-Nobel Platz, Troisdorf

Nobel Metamorphoses (German: Nobel-Metamorphoen) is a 1984 public sculpture by Hans-Jürgen Breuste in Troisdorf, North Rhine-Westphalia, Germany.

Located in Alfred-Nobel Platz, at the centre of the pedestrianised main street of the city, the sculpture is a critical comparison of the work and inventions Alfred Nobel, and the eponymous peace prize. Since 1886 the city had been the location of production facilities, and at the time of the sculpture's installation the headquarters, of Dynamit Nobel – the weapons and company founded by Nobel.

The work features a "gate" standing three meters tall constructed of stainless steel beams, in the centre of the crossbeam is inscribed "Nobel". However, the gate is blocked by a sheet pierced, tarnished, steel as well as being barricaded by two diagonal beams. Below are two "coffins" – while one is engraved with the names of all peace prize recipients since its inception in 1901, the other is engraved with statistics of war deaths since that same year.

Sculpture details

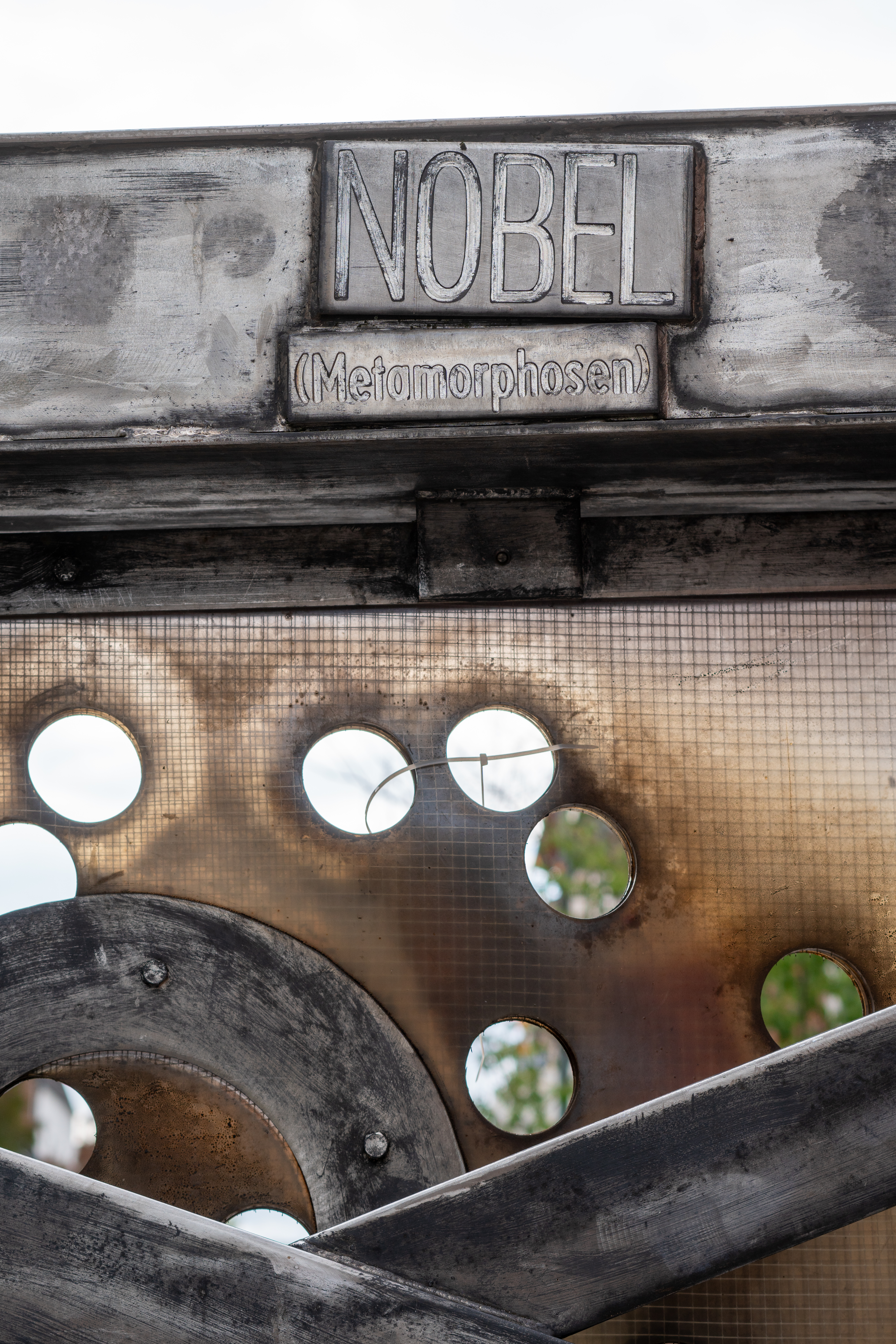

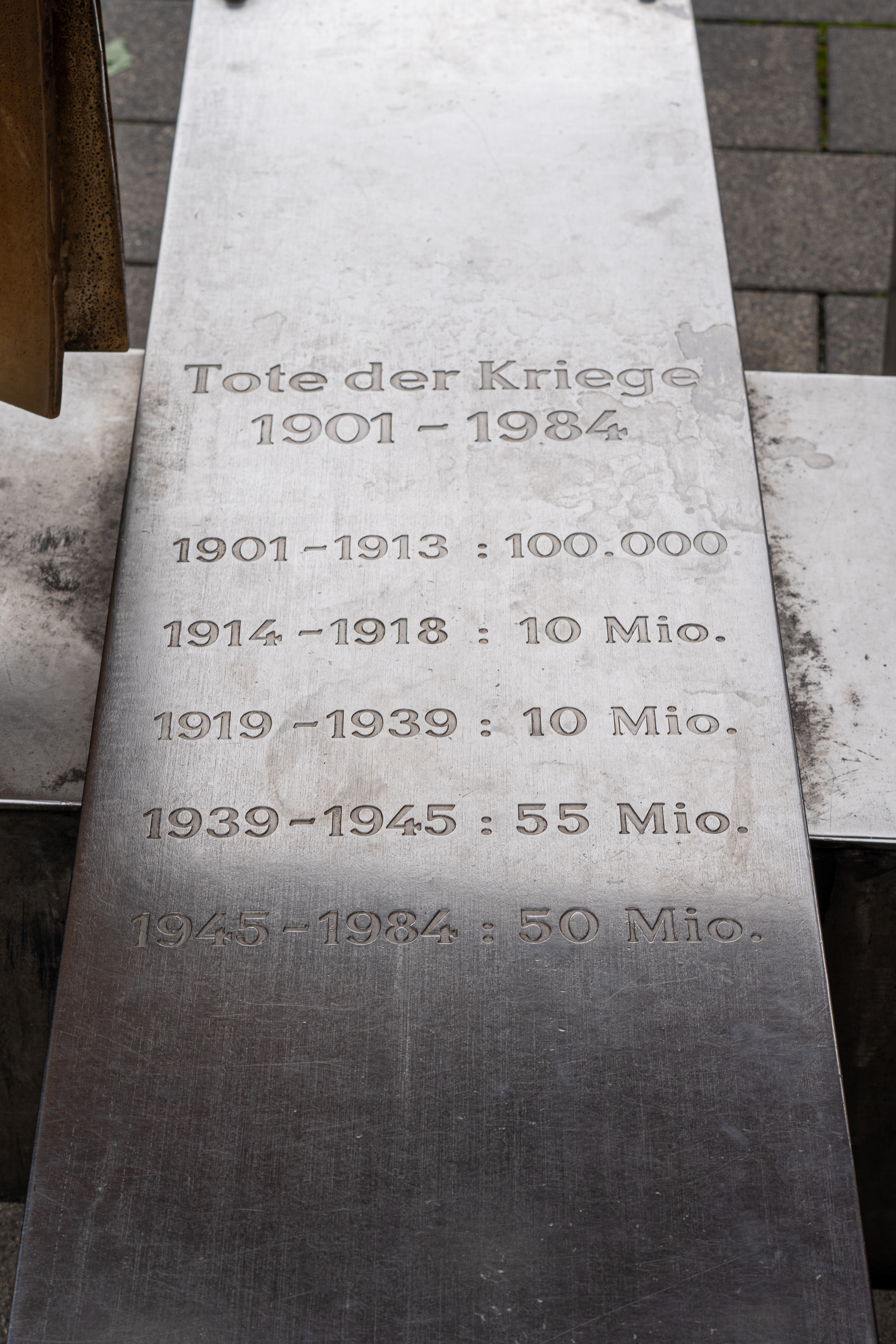

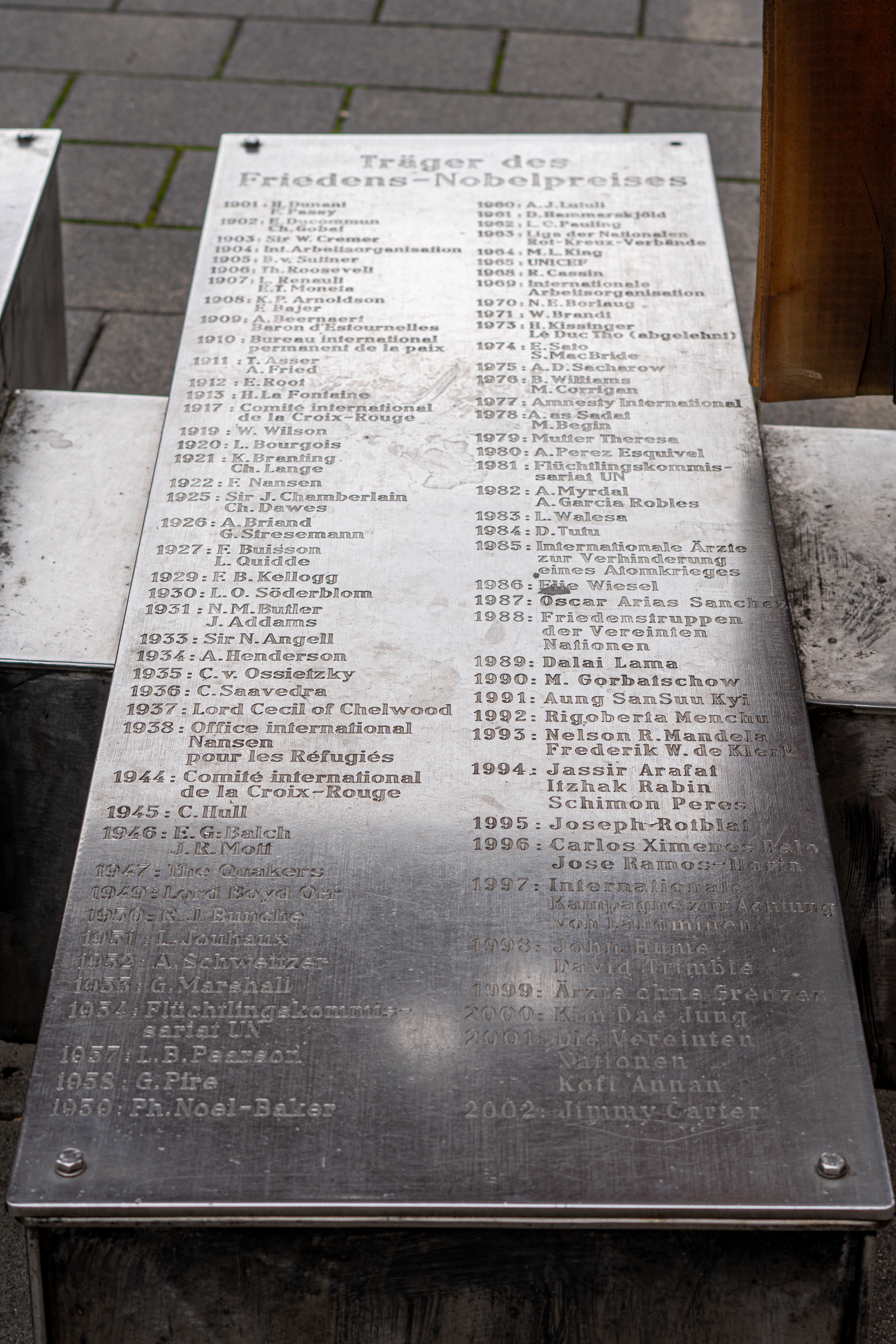
