= Alfred Nobel =

Swedish chemist and inventor (1833–1896)

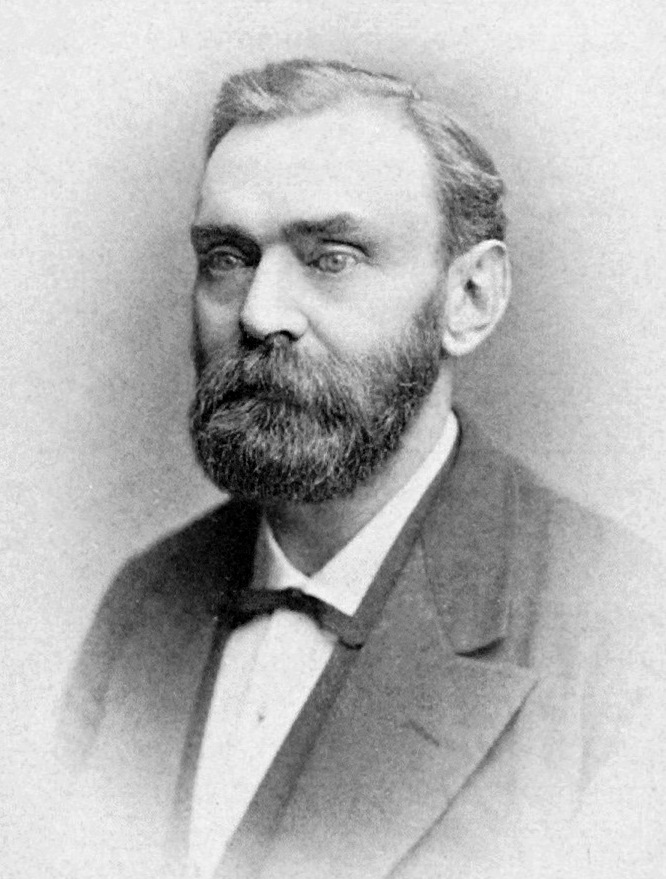
- Nobel in 1896
- Born: Alfred Bernhard Nobel; 21 October 1833; Stockholm, Sweden
- Died: 10 December 1896 (aged 63); Sanremo, Italy
- Resting place: Norra begravningsplatsen, Solna, Sweden; 59°21′24.52″N 18°1′9.43″E
- Monuments: Nobel Monument, New York City, U.S.
- Occupations: Chemist; Engineer; Inventor; Businessman
- Known for: Inventing dynamite (1866); Establishing the Nobel Prizes
- Parents: Immanuel; Andriette
- Relatives: Emil Oskar Nobel (brother); Robert Nobel (brother); Ludvig Nobel (brother)
- Family: Nobel

Alfred Bernhard Nobel (/noʊˈbɛl/ noh-BEL; Swedish: [ˈǎlːfrɛd nʊˈbɛlː]; 21 October 1833 – 10 December 1896) was a Swedish chemist, inventor, engineer, and businessman. Nobel is known for inventing dynamite, as well as having bequeathed his fortune to establish the Nobel Prizes. He worked on various important contributions and inventions to science, holding 355 patents during his life.

Born into the prominent Nobel family in Stockholm, Nobel displayed an early aptitude for science and learning, particularly in chemistry and languages; he became fluent in six languages and filed his first patent at the age of 24. He embarked on many business ventures with his family, most notably owning the company Bofors—which was an iron and steel producer that he had developed into a major manufacturer of cannons and other armaments. Nobel's most famous invention, dynamite, was an explosive made using nitroglycerin, which was patented in 1867. He further invented gelignite in 1875 and ballistite in 1887.

Upon his death, Nobel donated his fortune to a foundation to fund the Nobel Prizes, which annually recognize those who have "conferred the greatest benefit to mankind". The synthetic element nobelium was named after him, and his name and legacy also survive in companies such as Dynamit Nobel and AkzoNobel, which descend from mergers with companies he founded. Nobel was elected a member of the Royal Swedish Academy of Sciences, which, pursuant to his will, is responsible for choosing the Nobel laureates in Physics and in Chemistry.

== Biography ==
=== Early life and education ===
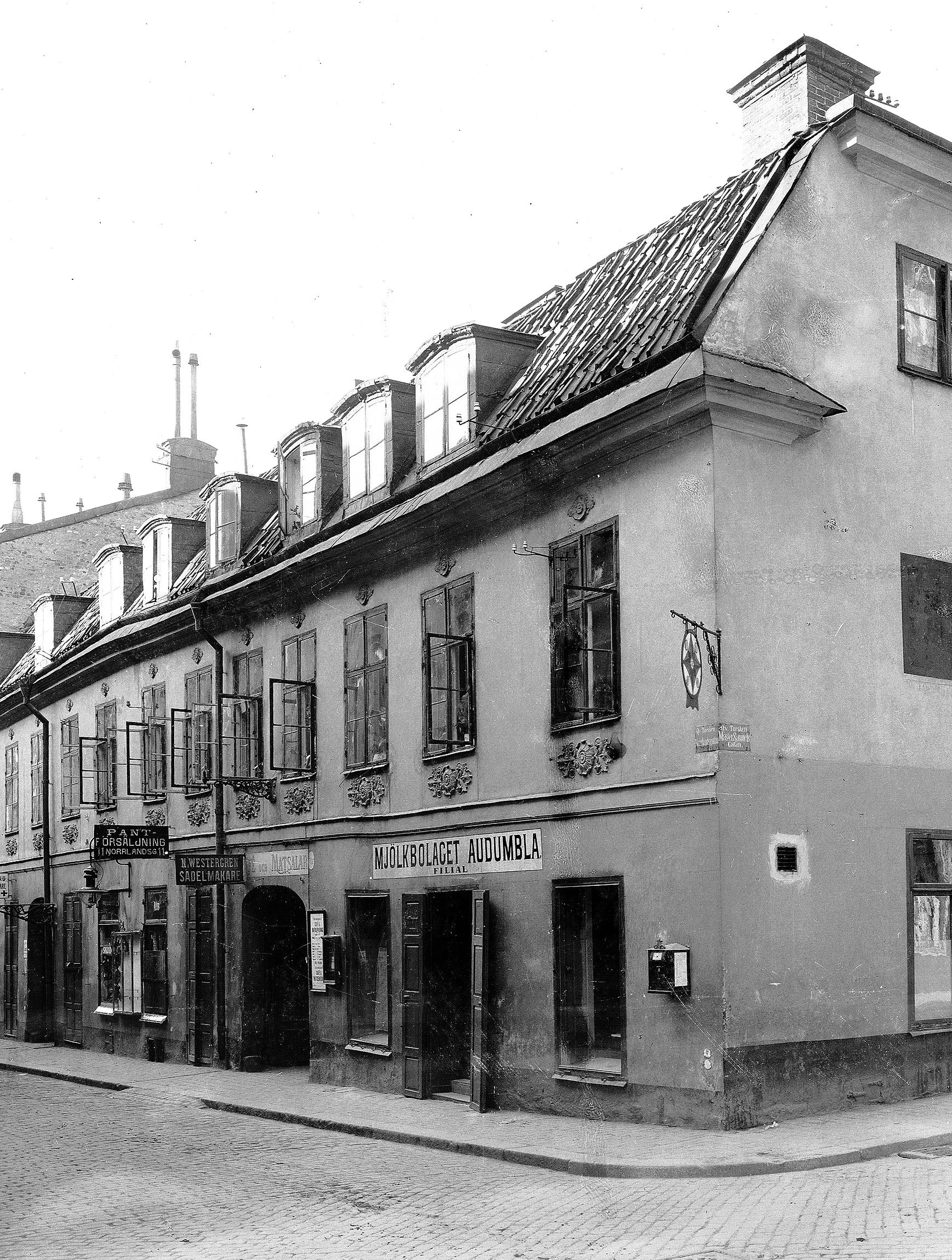
The birthplace of Alfred Nobel at Norrlandsgatan in Stockholm

Alfred Nobel was born in Stockholm, Sweden, on 21 October 1833. He was the third son of Immanuel Nobel (1801–1872), an inventor and engineer, and Andriette Nobel (née Ahlsell; 1805–1889). The couple married in 1827 and had eight children. The family was impoverished, and only Alfred and his three brothers survived beyond their childhood. Through his father, Alfred Nobel was a descendant of the Swedish scientist Olaus Rudbeck (1630–1702). Nobel's father was an alumnus of the Royal Institute of Technology in Stockholm and was an engineer and inventor who built bridges and buildings and experimented with different ways of blasting rocks. He encouraged and taught Nobel from a young age.

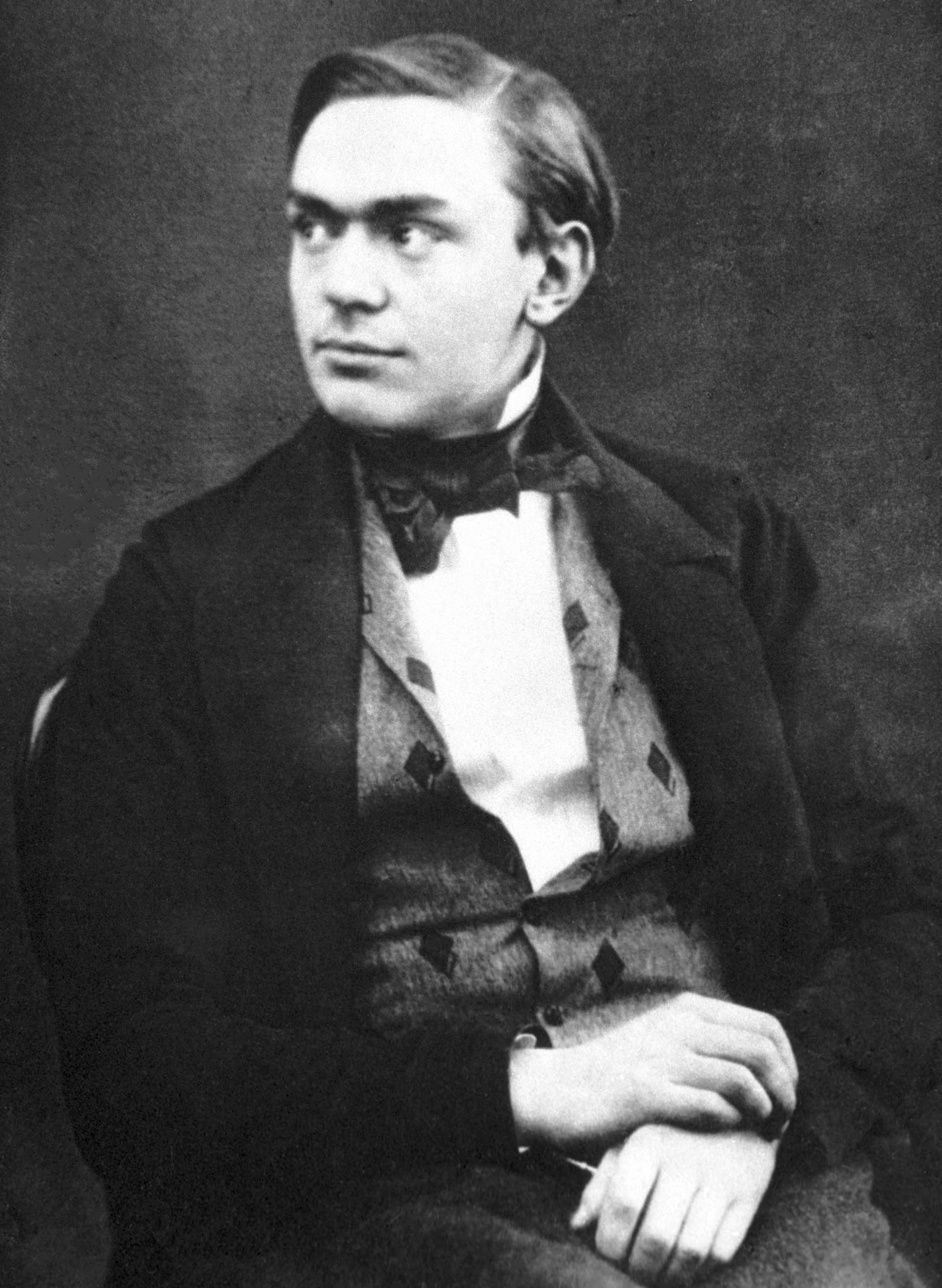
Alfred Nobel at a young age in the 1850s

Following various business failures caused by the loss of some barges of building material, Immanuel Nobel was forced into bankruptcy. Nobel's father moved to Saint Petersburg, then part of the Russian Empire, and grew successful there as a manufacturer of machine tools and explosives. He invented the veneer lathe, which made possible the production of modern plywood, and started work on the naval mine. In 1842, the family joined him in the city. Now prosperous, his parents were able to send Nobel to private tutors, and the boy excelled in his studies, particularly in chemistry and languages, achieving fluency in English, French, German, and Russian. For 18 months, from 1841 to 1842, Nobel attended the Jacobs Apologistic School in Stockholm, his only schooling; he never attended university.

Nobel gained proficiency in Swedish, French, Russian, English, German, and Italian. He also developed sufficient literary skill to write poetry in English. His Nemesis is a prose tragedy in four acts about the Italian noblewoman Beatrice Cenci. It was printed while he was dying, but the entire stock was destroyed immediately after his death, except for three copies, being regarded as scandalous and blasphemous. It was published in Sweden in 2003 and has been translated into Slovenian, French, Italian, and Spanish.

=== Scientific career ===
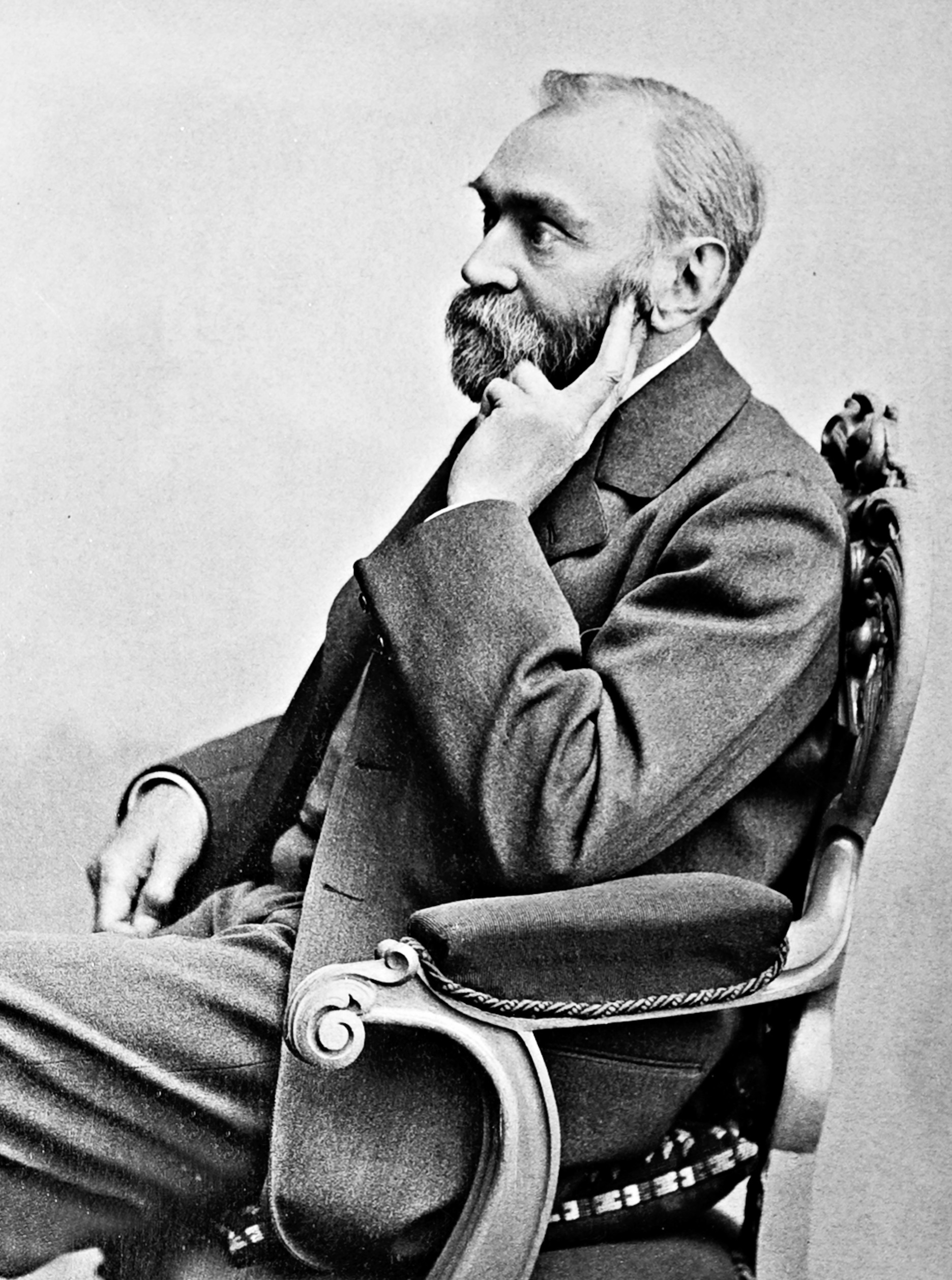
Portrait of Nobel by Gösta Florman (1831–1900)

As a young man, Nobel studied with chemist Nikolai Zinin; then, in 1850, he went to Paris to further the work. There he met Ascanio Sobrero, who had synthesized nitroglycerin three years before. Sobrero strongly opposed the use of nitroglycerin because it was unpredictable, exploding when subjected to variable heat or pressure. But Nobel became interested in finding a way to control and use nitroglycerin as a commercially usable explosive; it had much more power than gunpowder. In 1851 at age 18, he went to the United States for one year to study, working for a short period under Swedish-American inventor John Ericsson, who designed the American Civil War ironclad, USS Monitor. Nobel filed his first patent, an English patent for a gas meter, in 1857, while his first Swedish patent, which he received in 1863, was on "ways to prepare gunpowder". The family factory produced armaments for the Crimean War (1853–1856), but had difficulty switching back to regular domestic production when the fighting ended and they filed for bankruptcy. In 1859, Nobel's father left his factory in the care of the second son, Ludvig Nobel (1831–1888), who greatly improved the business. Nobel and his parents returned to Sweden from Russia, and Nobel devoted himself to the study of explosives, and especially to the safe manufacture and use of nitroglycerin. Nobel invented a detonator in 1863, and in 1865 designed the blasting cap.

On 3 September 1864, a shed used for preparation of nitroglycerin exploded at the factory in Heleneborg, Stockholm, Sweden, killing five people, including Nobel's younger brother Emil. He was then deprived of his license to produce explosives. Fazed by the accident, Nobel founded the company Nitroglycerin AB in Vinterviken so that he could continue to work in a more isolated area. Nobel invented dynamite in 1867, a substance easier and safer to handle than the more unstable nitroglycerin. Dynamite was patented in the US and the UK and was used extensively in mining and the building of transport networks internationally. In 1875, Nobel invented gelignite, more stable and powerful than dynamite, and in 1887, patented ballistite, a predecessor of cordite.

Nobel was elected a member of the Royal Swedish Academy of Sciences in 1884, the same institution that would later select laureates for two of the Nobel prizes, and he received an honorary doctorate from Uppsala University in 1893. Nobel's brothers Ludvig and Robert founded the oil company Branobel and became hugely rich in their own right. Nobel invested in these and amassed great wealth through the development of these new oil regions. It operated mainly in Baku, Azerbaijan, but also in Cheleken, Turkmenistan. During his life, Nobel was issued 355 patents internationally, and by his death, his business had established more than 90 explosives and armament factories, despite his apparently pacifist character.

=== Inventions ===
Nobel found that when nitroglycerin was incorporated in an absorbent inert substance like kieselguhr (diatomaceous earth) it became safer and more convenient to handle, and this mixture he patented in 1867 as "dynamite". Nobel demonstrated his explosive for the first time that year, at a quarry in Redhill, Surrey, England. To help reestablish his name and improve the image of his business from the earlier controversies associated with dangerous explosives, Nobel had also considered naming the highly powerful substance "Nobel's Safety Powder", which is the text used in his patent, but settled with Dynamite instead, referring to the Greek word for "power" (δύναμις).

Nobel later combined nitroglycerin with various nitrocellulose compounds, similar to collodion, but settled on a more efficient recipe combining another nitrate explosive, and obtained a transparent, jelly-like substance, which was a more powerful explosive than dynamite. Gelignite, or blasting gelatin, as it was named, was patented in 1876; and was followed by a host of similar combinations, modified by the addition of potassium nitrate and various other substances. Gelignite was more stable, powerful, transportable and conveniently formed to fit into bored holes, like those used in drilling and mining, than the previously used compounds. It was adopted as the standard technology for mining in the "Age of Engineering", bringing Nobel a great amount of financial success, though at a cost to his health. An offshoot of this research resulted in Nobel's invention of ballistite, the precursor of many modern smokeless powder explosives and still used as a rocket propellant.

=== Nobel Prize ===
Obverse of a Nobel Prize medal

There is a well-known story about the origin of the Nobel Prize, although historians have been unable to verify it, and some dismiss the story as a myth. In 1888, the death of his brother Ludvig supposedly caused several newspapers to publish obituaries of Alfred in error. One French newspaper condemned him for his invention of military explosives—in many versions of the story, dynamite is quoted, although this was mainly used for civilian applications—and this is said to have brought about his decision to leave a better legacy after his death. The obituary supposedly stated, Le marchand de la mort est mort ("The merchant of death is dead"), and according to the myth went on to say, "Dr. Alfred Nobel, who became rich by finding ways to kill more people faster than ever before, died yesterday." Nobel read the obituary and was appalled at the idea that he would be remembered in this way. His decision to posthumously donate the majority of his wealth to found the Nobel Prize has been credited to him wanting to leave behind a better legacy. However, it has been questioned whether or not the obituary in question actually existed. An actual obituary (pictured) stated "A man who can only with the utmost difficulty be considered a benefactor of mankind has died yesterday at Cannes. It is Mr. Nobel, inventor of dynamite. Mr. Nobel was Swedish." It was published on the first page of the Figaro on the 15th of April 1888 and retracted the next day.

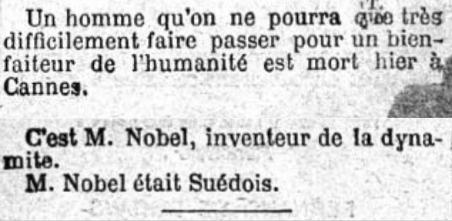
Obituary of Alfred Nobel published on April 15th 1888.

On 27 November 1895, at the Swedish-Norwegian Club in Paris, Nobel signed his last will and set aside the bulk of his estate to establish the Nobel Prizes, to be awarded annually without distinction of nationality. After taxes and bequests to individuals, Nobel's will allocated 94% of his total assets, 31,225,000 Swedish kronor, to establish the five Nobel Prizes. By 2022, the foundation had approximately 6 billion Swedish Kronor of invested capital.

The first three of these prizes are awarded for eminence in physical science, in chemistry and in medical science or physiology; the fourth is for literary work "in an ideal direction" and the fifth prize is to be given to the person or society that renders the greatest service to the cause of international fraternity, in the suppression or reduction of standing armies, or in the establishment or furtherance of peace congresses.

The formulation for the literary prize being given for a work "in an ideal direction" (i idealisk riktning in Swedish) is cryptic and has caused much confusion. For many years, the Swedish Academy interpreted "ideal" as "idealistic" (idealistisk) and used it as a reason not to give the prize to important but less romantic authors, such as Henrik Ibsen and Leo Tolstoy. This interpretation has since been revised, and the prize has been awarded to, for example, Dario Fo and José Saramago, who do not belong to the camp of literary idealism.

There was room for interpretation by the bodies he had named for deciding on the physical sciences and chemistry prizes, given that he had not consulted them before making the will. In his one-page testament, he stipulated that the money go to discoveries or inventions in the physical sciences and to discoveries or improvements in chemistry. He had opened the door to technological awards, but had not left instructions on how to deal with the distinction between science and technology. Since the deciding bodies he had chosen were more concerned with the former, the prizes went to scientists more often than engineers, technicians, or other inventors.

Sweden's central bank Sveriges Riksbank celebrated its 300th anniversary in 1968 by donating a large sum of money to the Nobel Foundation to be used to set up a sixth prize in the field of economics in honor of Alfred Nobel. In 2001, Alfred Nobel's great-great-nephew, Peter Nobel (born 1931), asked the Bank of Sweden to differentiate its award to economists given "in Alfred Nobel's memory" from the five other awards. This request added to the controversy over whether the Bank of Sweden Prize in Economic Sciences in Memory of Alfred Nobel is actually a legitimate "Nobel Prize".

=== Health issues and death ===
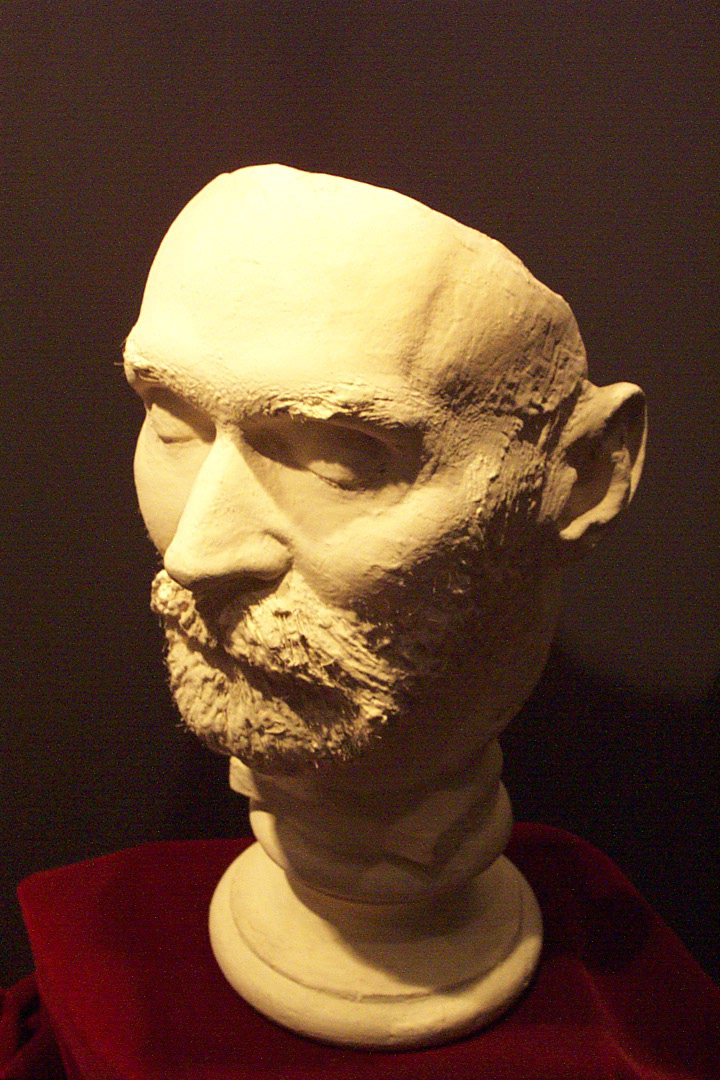
Alfred Nobel's death mask, at Björkborn Manor, Nobel's residence in Karlskoga, Sweden

In his letters to his mistress, Hess, Nobel described constant pain, debilitating migraines, and "paralyzing" fatigue, leading some to believe that he suffered from fibromyalgia. However, his concerns at the time were dismissed as hypochondria, leading to further depression.

By 1895, Nobel had developed angina pectoris.

On 27 November 1895, he finalized his will and testament, leaving most of his wealth in trust, unbeknownst to his family, to fund the Nobel Prize awards.

On 10 December 1896, he suffered a stroke/intracerebral hemorrhage and was first partially paralyzed and then died, aged 63. He is buried in Norra begravningsplatsen in Stockholm.

Based on his experimentation with explosives, his strenuous work habits, and the decline in his health at the end of the 1870s, some hypothesize that nitroglycerine poisoning was a contributing factor to his death.

== Personal life ==
=== Religion ===
Nobel was Lutheran and, during his years living in Paris, he regularly attended the Church of Sweden Abroad led by pastor Nathan Söderblom, who received the Nobel Peace Prize in 1930. He was an agnostic in youth and became an atheist later in life, though he still donated generously to the Church.

=== Romantic relationships and personality ===
Nobel remained a solitary character, given to periods of depression. He never married, although his biographers note that he had at least three loves. His first love was in Russia with a girl named Alexandra, who rejected his marriage proposal.

In 1876, Austro-Bohemian Countess Bertha von Suttner became his secretary, but she left him after a brief stay to marry her previous lover, Baron Arthur Gundaccar von Suttner. Her contact with Nobel was brief, yet she corresponded with him until he died in 1896, and probably influenced his decision to include the Nobel Peace Prize in his will. She was awarded the 1905 Nobel Peace prize "for her audacity to oppose the horrors of war".

Nobel's longest-lasting romance was an 18-year relationship with Sofija Hess from Celje, whom he met in 1876 in Baden bei Wien, where she worked as an employee in a flower shop that catered to wealthy clientele. The extent of their relationship was revealed by a collection of 221 letters sent by Nobel to Hess over 15 years. At the time that they met, Nobel was 43 years old while Hess was 26. Their relationship, which was not merely platonic, ended when she became pregnant with the child of another man, although Nobel continued to support her financially until Hess married the father of her child as to avoid her being ostracized. In the letters sent to Hess, Nobel mentions many times his distaste for not only Hess' Jewish ancestry, but also her family, and makes antisemitic remarks towards Jews as a whole. Sofie's failure to respond to his antisemitic diatribes is surprising, and far from protesting against Nobel's remarks, she used abusive language against Jews herself and eventually converted to Protestantism in 1894 in a naive attempt to grow closer to Nobel. Though even with her spiteful remarks against her heritage, Hess was always loyal to her family and supported them financially. Nobel remarked that she was his "great devourer of banknotes".

Nobel also displayed characteristics of chauvinism in the letters to Hess, writing among other things; "You neither work, nor write, nor read, nor think" and told her that she had a "microscopic brain" as well as trying to make her feel guilty for his attention by writing "I have sacrificed [to you] my intellectual life, my reputation which always rests on our association with others, my whole interaction with the cultured world."

=== Residences ===
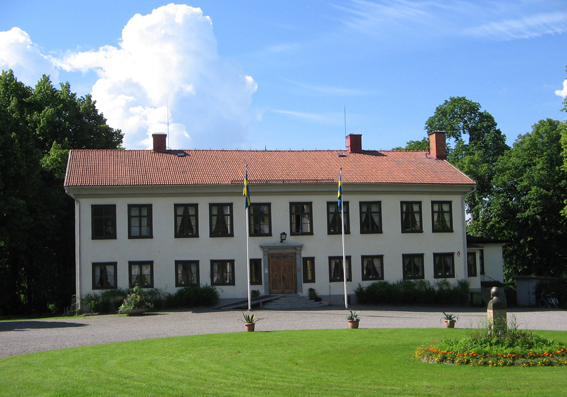
Björkborn Manor, in Karlskoga, was Alfred Nobel's last residence in Sweden.

Nobel traveled for much of his business life, maintaining companies in Europe and America. From 1865 to 1873, Nobel lived in Krümmel (now in the municipality of Geesthacht, near Hamburg). From 1873 to 1891, he lived in a house on the Avenue de Malakoff in Paris.

In 1891, after being accused of high treason against France for selling Ballistite to Italy, he moved from Paris to Sanremo, Italy, acquiring Villa Nobel, overlooking the Mediterranean Sea, where he died in 1896.

In 1894, when he acquired Bofors-Gullspång, the Björkborn Manor was included, where he stayed during the summers. It is now a museum.

== Monument to Alfred Nobel ==
The Monument to Alfred Nobel (Russian: Памятник Альфреду Нобелю, 59.960787°N 30.334905°E) stands in Saint Petersburg along the Bolshaya Nevka River on the Petrogradskaya Embankment, the street where Nobel's family lived until 1859. It was dedicated in 1991 to mark the 90th anniversary of the first Nobel Prize presentation. Diplomat Thomas Bertelman and Professor Arkady Melua were initiators of the creation of the monument in 1989, and they provided funds for the construction of it. The abstract metal sculpture was designed by local artists Sergey Alipov and Pavel Shevchenko, and appears to be an explosion or branches of a tree.

== Criticism ==
Criticism of Nobel usually focuses on his leading role in the manufacture and sale of arms and ammunitions. Some people question his motives for his creation of the Nobel Prize, suggesting that he created it in an attempt to improve his reputation. For example, the 1984 public artwork Nobel Metamorphoses in Troisdorf, Germany – at the time the location of the Dynamit Nobel headquarters – contrasts war death statistics to peace prize recipients since the latter's inauguration in 1901 through a critical lens.

=== Antisemitism ===
Nobel made antisemitic statements in letters to his mistress Sofie Hess. During the late 19th and early 20th century, much of Europe was swept up by a strong current of virulent antisemitism. Within Nobel's letters are examples of his negative view of people of Jewish ancestry such as Hess's family. For example, he writes: "In my experience, [Jews] never do anything out of goodwill. They act merely out of selfishness or a desire to show off... among selfish and inconsiderate people, they are the most selfish and inconsiderate... all others exist to be fleeced."

== Honors and Awards ==
Officer of the Order of Legion of Honour
