= Norrlandsgatan =

Street in Norrmalm, Stockholm, Sweden

Coordinates: 59.3331°N 18.0715°E

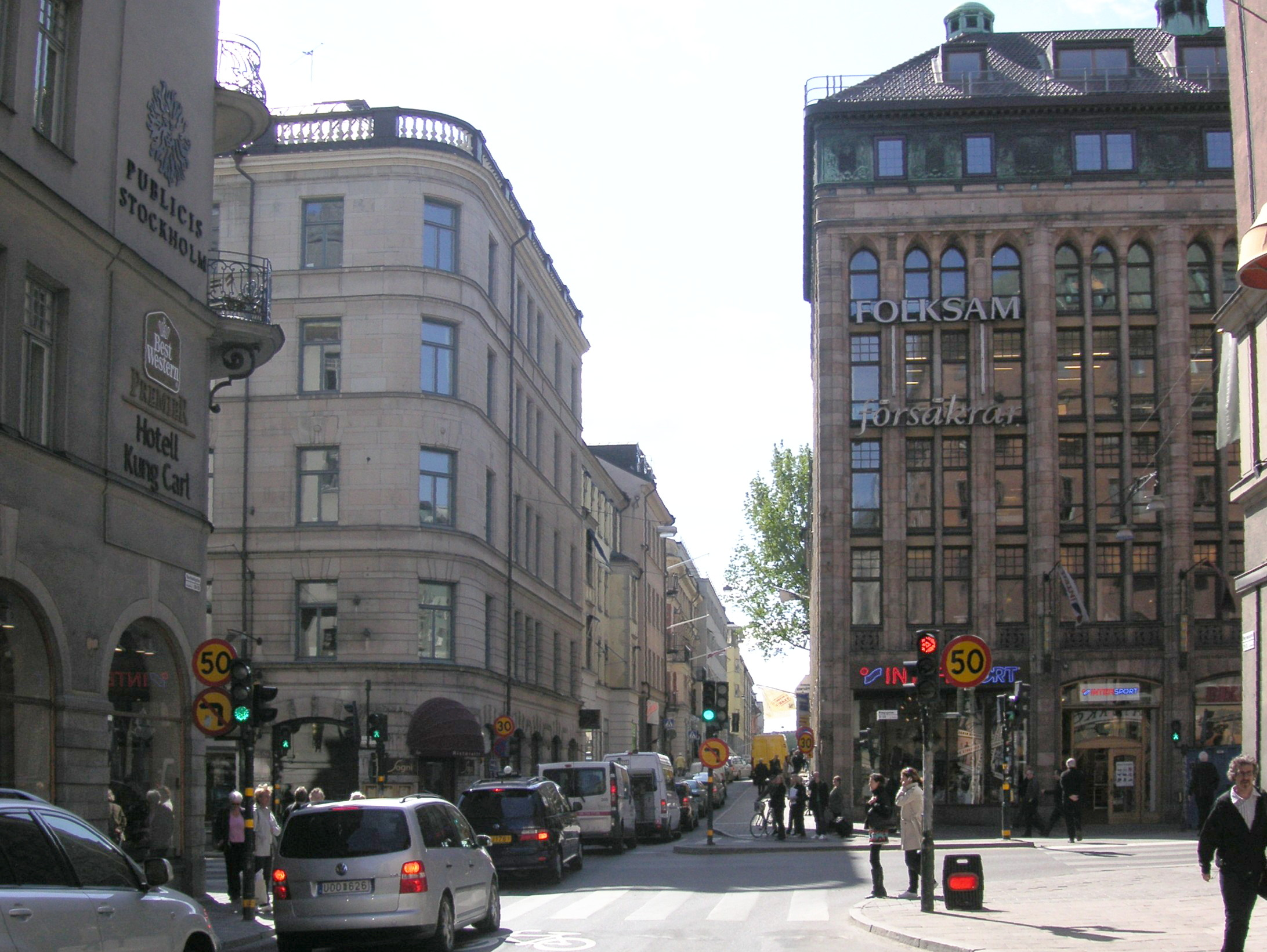
Norrlandsgatan

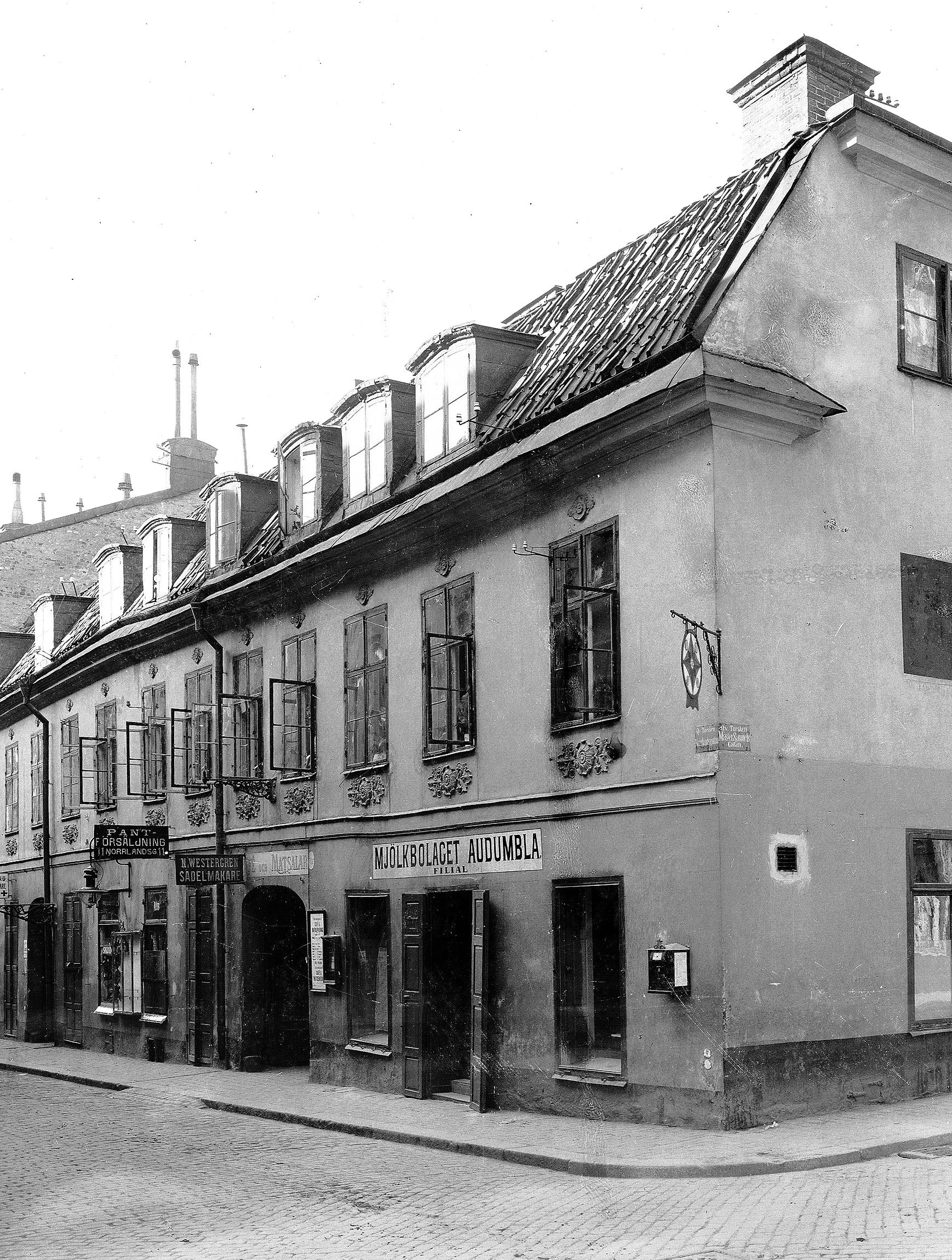
The birthplace of Alfred Nobel at Norrlandsgatan.

Norrlandsgatan is a street at Norrmalm, Stockholm. The street stretches from Birger Jarlsgatan to Hamngatan. The restaurant Fontainebleau was located at Norrlandsgatan until it was destroyed in a bombing on 31 December 1982.
