= Studies in History of Biology =

Studies in History of Biology was an annual publication edited by William Coleman and Camille Limoges and published by Johns Hopkins University Press, Baltimore MD, in seven volumes from 1977 to 1984.

== Volumes ==
- Vol. 1 (1977) 232 pp. ISBN 0-8018-1862-1
  - Ravin, Arnold R.: The gene as catalyst, the gene as organism. 1-45. PMID 11609975
  - Albury, William Randall: Experiment and explanation in the physiology of Bichat and Magendie. 47–131. PMID 11609978
  - Cowan, Ruth Schwartz: Nature and nurture: the interplay of biology and politics in the work of Francis Galton. 133–208. PMID 11609976
  - Holmes, Frederic L.: Conceptual history: a review of François Jacob, La Logique du Vivant - The Logic of Life. 209–218. PMID 11609977
- Vol. 2 (1978) 224 pp. ISBN 0-8018-2034-0
  - Staum, M.S.: Medical components in Cabanis's science of man. 1-31. PMID 11610408
  - Ospovat, Dov: Perfect adaptation and teleological explanation: approaches to the problem of the history of life in the mid-nineteenth century. 33–56. PMID 11610411
  - Kottler, D.B.: Louis Pasteur and molecular dissymmetry, 1844–1857. 57–98. PMID 11610412
  - Todes, Daniel: V.O. Kovalevskii: the genesis, content, and reception of his paleontological work. 99–165.
  - Provine, W. B.: The role of mathematical population geneticists in the evolutionary synthesis of the 1930s and 1940s. 167–192. PMID 11610409
  - Haraway, D.J. & Mocek, R.: Reinterpretation or rehabilitation: an exercise in contemporary Marxist history of science. 193–209. PMID 11610410
- Vol. 3 (1979) 297 pp. ISBN 0-8018-2215-7 - A festschrift for Ernst Mayr on his 75th birthday in 1979.
  - Burkhardt, Richard W. Jr.: Closing the door on Lord Morton's mare: the rise and fall of telegony. 1-21. PMID 11610983
  - Sulloway, Frank J.: Geographic isolation in Darwin's thinking: the vicissitudes of a crucial idea. 23–65. PMID 11610987
  - Coleman, William: Bergmann's Rule: animal heat as a biological phenomenon. 67–88. PMID 11610989
  - Winsor, Mary Pickard: Louis Agassiz and the species question. 89–117. PMID 11610990
  - Gould, Stephen Jay: Agassiz's marginalia in Lyell's Principles, or the perils of uniformity and the ambiguity of heroes. 119–138.
  - Churchill, Frederick B.: Sex and the single organism: biological theories of sexuality in mid-nineteenth century. 139–177. PMID 11610984
  - Allen, Garland E.: Naturalists and experimentalists: the genotype and the phenotype. 179–209. PMID 11610985
  - Provine, William B.: Francis B. Sumner and the evolutionary synthesis. 211–240. PMID 11610986
  - Adams, Mark B.: From "gene fund" to "gene pool": on the evolution of evolutionary language. 241–285. PMID 11610988
- Vol. 4 (1980) 206 pp. ISBN 0-8018-2362-5
  - Leys, Ruth: Background to the reflex controversy: William Alison and the doctrine of sympathy before Hall. 1-66. PMID 11615829
  - Kohn, David: Theories to work by: rejected theories, reproduction and Darwin's path to natural selection. 67–170. PMID 11615830
  - Cittadino, Eugene: Ecology and the professionalization of botany in America. 171–198.
- Vol. 5 (1981) 216 pp. ISBN 0-8018-2566-0
  - Cross, Stephen J.: John Hunter, the animal oeconomy, and late eighteenth-century physiological discourse. 5: 1–110. PMID 11611008
  - Timothy Lenoir: The Göttingen School and the development of transcendental Naturphilosophie in the Romantic Era. 111–205. PMID 11611009
- Vol. 6 (1982) 231 pp. ISBN 0-8018-2856-2
  - Hodge, M.J.S.: Darwin and the laws of the animate part of the terrestrial system (1835-1837): on the Lyellian origins of his zoonomical explanatory program. 1–106.
  - Maienschein, J.: Experimental biology in transition: Harrison's embryology, 1895–1910. 107–127.
  - Haraway, Donna: Signs of dominance: from a physiology to a cybernetics of primate society, C.R. Carpenter, 1930–1970. 129–219.
- Vol. 7 (1984) 160 pp. ISBN 0-8018-2995-X
  - Eddy, J.H.: Buffon, organic alterations, and man. 1-45. PMID 11611371
  - Jacyna, L.S.: Principles of general physiology: the comparative dimension of British neuroscience in the 1830s and 1840s. 7: 47–92. PMID 11611372
