= Arkady Melua =

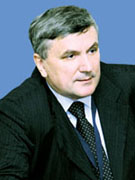
- Born: 7 February 1950 (age 75); Koziatyn, Ukrainian SSR

Arkady Ivanovich Melua (7 February 1950) is the general director and editor-in-chief of the scientific publishing house, Humanistica.

== Life and work ==
Starting in 1969, Melua served and worked as an engineer at the Ministry of Defense facilities. In 1973, while having served in the military, he received a degree in engineering at the Leningrad Engineering-Construction Institute. He participated in the construction of an educational nuclear reactor in one of the military schools. In 1974, he began conducting scientific research.

Melua was a member of the Soviet Union project of long-term lunar base (research leader - the chief designer of the Design Bureau of General Mechanical Engineering, Academician Vladimir Barmin, curator in Saint Petersburg - Professor N. Krylov). He was an author of one of the country's first lunar inventions of special facilities and research equipment. As a scientist, he was a secretary of the "lunar laboratory" in Leningrad and was involved in the organization of work testing a number of research institutes of the country. Held short-term training of Cartography at the Moscow State University of space technology in the VIKU, biomedical issues at the Department of Aerospace Medicine in Sergei Kirov Military Medical Academy and other institutions. In this case he was engaged in training as a cosmonaut-researcher due to the program of the Academy of Sciences. In the late 1970s under the program of subsatellite environmental studies was one of the developers of methods and organizer eternalizing studies of air basin in the cities of Leningrad and Vinnitsa (compatible. with the Research Institute of Applied Physical Problems of the BSU and LenNICHI). In the 1980 - member of scientific-methodical support of experiments on the landing of large cargoes to polar regions (arms. group - professor N.P. Selivanov and colonel A.Zh. Sidorenko). Participated in military exercises (1976, 1981).

=== Activities in the scientific councils and commissions ===
In the mid-1970s Melua began to become acquainted with the scientific and technical documents of the Nobel Family (related to the patenting of methods of protection of designed lunar installations). In the late 1970s, he presented the report at an international symposium in Novosibirsk containing proposals on the use of space technology for civilian industries; from this time he began collaboration with the USSR academician A. L. Yanshin and the academician of Academy of Medical Sciences of the USSR V. P. Kaznacheev. He worked in the Scientific Council on Space Research in Siberia and in the Far East, the Scientific Council on Biosphere of the Presidium of the USSR, the Commission for the Study of Earth's natural resources from space (member offices), the Commission for the Study of Scientific Heritage of Academician Vladimir Vernadsky. For each of these areas he prepared and published research papers, organized by the release of the series of scientific publications by other authors. One of the organizers (together with Academician K. Y. Kondratyev) and Deputy Chairman of the Scientific Council on Space Research for the National Economy of the International Space Station USSR in Leningrad. In 1984, he successfully passed a medical examination in preparation for space flight. In 1985, he received his Ph.D. in technical sciences ("Automated control systems of space objects"). In 1991, he defended his doctoral dissertation in philosophy ("Biosphere Research Methodology").

=== Teaching and publishing activities ===
Melua has been teaching since 1975. He has published over 1200 scientific works (inventions, monographs, articles and collections, educational publications, encyclopedias) on peaceful use of space achievements, ecology, history, science and technology, special engineering, as well as on some aspects of financial market development in Russia in 1990s. Script author of scientific film about V.I. Vernadsky (compatible. with L. Volkov). He worked as a senior research associate and was a branch director of the Institute of History of Science and Technology of Russian Academy of Sciences until 1995. In that year, he became the founder and director of the Scientific Publishing House of Biographical International Encyclopedia "Humanistica". He founded a series of biographical encyclopedias "Humanistica"; in 1990, he published the first vocabulary program and biographical encyclopedia, author and publisher of the first published in this series of volumes, including those on the Internet. He developed and is implementing a plan to create the biographical database and issued a 100-volume Russian Biographical Encyclopedia (RBE), including the use of the archives of Russian diasporas in more than 120 countries. Cooperating with representing Sweden in the USSR and in Russia diplomats Dag Sebastian Ahlander, Tomas Bertelman, scientists Michael Sohlman, Svante Lindqvist and others, contributed to the joint historical research.

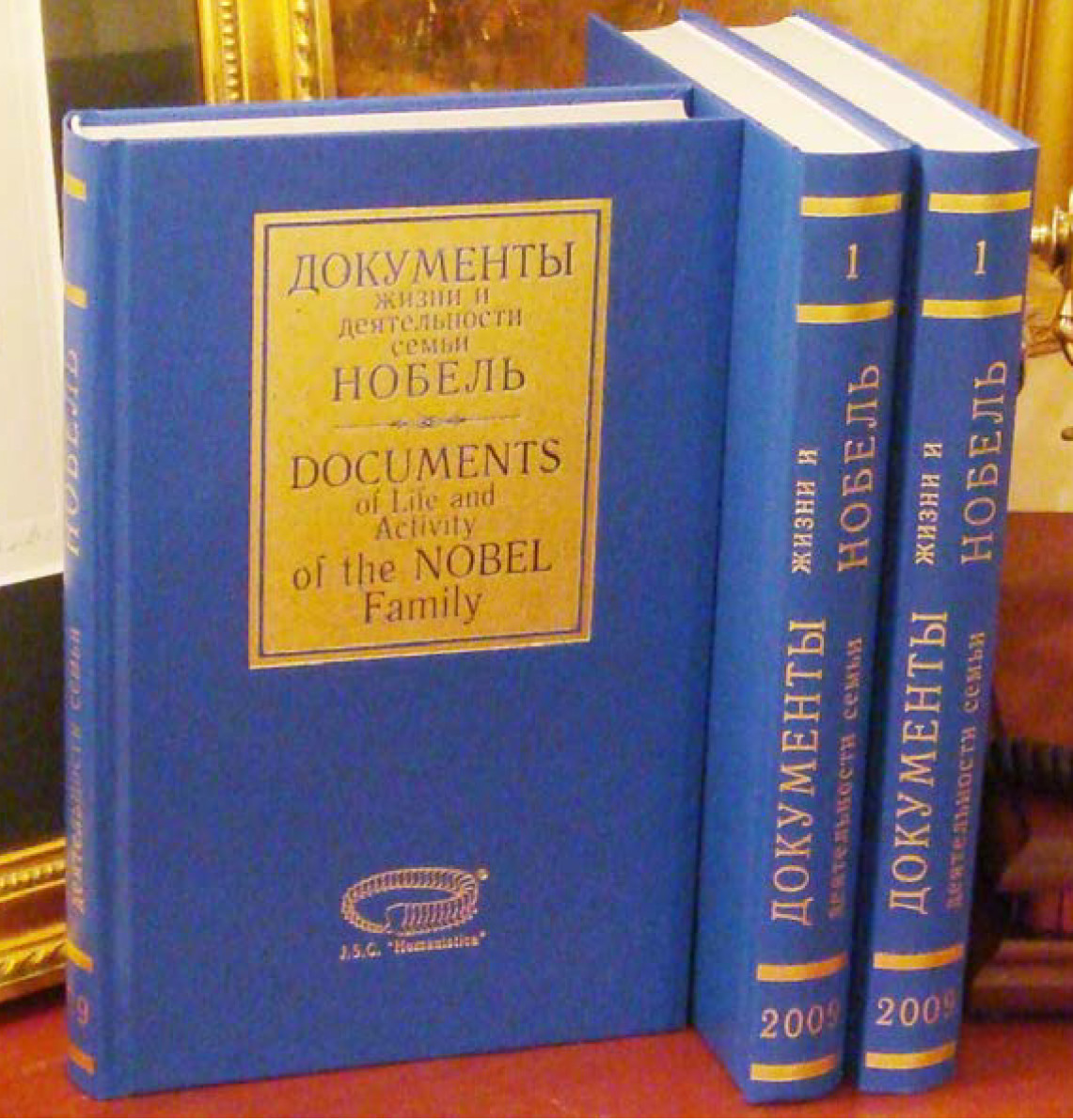
Some books from the multi-volume edition of the "Documents of life and work of the Nobel Family"

=== Nobel Prize and the history of science ===
From 1986 to 2010 he was the president of the International Foundation for the History of Science - a public organization in St. Petersburg. As a president of the International Foundation for the History of Science he participated in the transfer to the balance of the fund of the icebreaker [Krassin (1917 icebreaker)]. On August 10, 1989, the icebreaker "Krasin" was handed to the balance of the International Foundation for the History of Science. Than the icebreaker was planned to be sold for scrap in the US. Only the prosecutor's office of St. Petersburg stopped the fraudulent deeds of Melua at the last moment. The whole book was written on a history of the icebraker Krasin' crew defence against been demolished. He was the initiator of the study of the Nobel Movement as a social phenomenon in the history of science and society (1989). He was the first person in the Soviet Union who signed the key documents in this area: with the leadership of the Nobel Foundation Declaration on Joint Action in this regard (1990, 1991), with the Royal Swedish Academy of Sciences dissemination of information in Russia about the Nobel Prize winners (1999). In 2011–2012, organized in Helsinki two exhibitions "The Nobel Family in Russia". The activities of the Nobel family is considering in the context of the history of the European society of the second half of the 19th century - the years of the emergence and development of the Vienna system of international relations. After the release of the 14th volume "Documents of Life and Activity of the Nobel Family" (2014) has begun the publication of previously little-known archives of the Nobel Family from different European countries. Held expedition to search for and study of artifacts activities and experience of memoralization heritage of the Nobels in Finland, Sweden, Germany, Italy, France, Czech Republic and other countries.

In September 1989, with the support and participation of the Ministry of Foreign Affairs of the USSR and the Soviet ambassador to Sweden, Boris Pankin, talks were held in Stockholm with the leadership of the Nobel Foundation, which initiated an impartial study of the wider family legacy in the Soviet Union and Nobel coverage of progressive ideas of the Nobel Family and the Nobel Movement as a whole. The organizer of two symposiums in St. Petersburg on the Nobel Prize winners, he created and installed a memorial sign in memory of Alfred Nobel, who worked in the city of Leningrad; the sign was installed in October 1991 near the house number 24 on the Petrograd embankment. The memorial sign was installed on the cost of the International Fund for the History of Science.

Initiator of humanitarian cooperation between the Nobel Foundation and the Soviet Cultural Foundation, he signed a Declaration of Cooperation (1991) together with the presidents of these funds, Dmitry Likhachov and L. Gillenstenom. In the 1990s, he participated in the nomination of Heydar Aliyev for the Nobel Peace Prize. In January 2009, he nominated the President of France Nicolas Sarkozy for the Nobel Peace Prize. In February 2010, he held the successful negotiations with the Royal Swedish Academy of Sciences and the Nobel Foundation in Stockholm. He published series of monographs entitled "The Nobel Review" (in Russian) and a multi-volume edition of the "Documents of life and work of the Nobel Family." These books show documents created in the 19th and early 20th centuries, presented by the archives of many countries, and also some comments to them. His books are in large libraries of different countries: Library of the Russian Academy of Sciences, Russian State Library, National Library of Russia, The British Library, Library of Congress, New York Public Library, Nobel Library of the Swedish Academy and other.

== Memberships ==
- Member of the Board of Directors of "ICB" (St. Petersburg) (1994–1996)
- Member of the Russian Academy of Natural Sciences
- Member of the Russian Engineering Academy
- Member of the Russian Academy of Cosmonautics
- Member of the European Academy of Natural Sciences

== Awards ==
- In 1993, the Presidium of Russian Academy of Sciences was awarded to him by the prize of Acad. Vinogradov for the scientific monograph "Lessons from the environmental mistakes" (with acad. A. L. Yanshin).
- Medal "50 Years of Nuclear Energy of Russia"
- Silver Medal of the Exhibition of Achievements of National Economy
- Mark of Honor Society of Assistance to the Army, Air Force and Navy
- Medal "300th Anniversary of the Russian Navy"
- Commemorative Medal of the Scientific Council of the Military Medical Academy
