= Dulles' Plan =

Central document of a conspiracy theory

Dulles' Plan or the Dulles Doctrine (Russian: План Даллеса or Доктрина Даллеса) is the central document of a Russian conspiracy theory, according to which the CIA chief Allen Dulles had developed a plan for the United States to destroy the Soviet Union during the Cold War by secretly corrupting the cultural heritage and moral values of the Soviet nation. The plan was first published in Russia shortly after the dissolution of the USSR and was often quoted by prominent Russian politicians, journalists, and writers.

The text originates from a work of fiction, a 1971 novel The Eternal Call (Russian: Вечный зов), by Anatoly Ivanov, where it is provided in the form of an exposition by one of the novel's villains, a Nazi collaborator. It was first published as a distinct "plan" and ascribed to Allen Dulles in a 1993 book by John (Snychov), Metropolitan of St. Petersburg and Ladoga. The literary origins of the plan were traced in the early 2000s.

The term "Dulles' Plan" may also refer to a series of out-of-context excerpts from the program NSC 20/1 ("US objectives with respect to Russia") as presented by Nikolay Yakovlev in his 1983 book CIA Against USSR. The original program outlined by the US National Security Council in 1948 established the basic policy towards the Soviet Union. However, this text neither has anything to do with the CIA or Allen Dulles, nor does its contents bear any textual similarity with the document presented by the supporters of the conspiracy theory.

== Contents ==
The "plan", written in the form of a villain's exposition, describes how the United States will destroy the Soviet (Russian) people from within by means of a "fifth column" seeking to corrupt basic cultural values of the Soviet society. This is to be accomplished by subverting the carriers of this culture (literature, theaters and cinema) to promote violence, depravity and other vices. In addition, these agents will work to plunge the governmental structure into chaos, bureaucracy and corruption, as well as sow nationalism, ethnic hatred and mistrust among the general populace.

== Origins ==
The text was first published in its modern form in 1993 in Metropolitan John (Snychov)'s article "The battle for Russia" and at the same time by Ukrainian poet Borys Oliynyk in another article. Since then it was cited (but not always taken as truth) by numerous Russian politicians (such as Vladimir Zhirinovsky, Nikolai Kondratenko, Sergey Glazyev), journalists, writers (Sergey Kara-Murza), and filmmaker (Nikita Mikhalkov). Speaker of the Council of the Republic of Belarus Natalya Kochanova used the plan to explain the situation in Belarus.

The entire plan (without any references to Dulles or the CIA) is voiced almost word-for-word by a villain character in the first edition of the novel The Eternal Call by Anatoly Ivanov. The second edition, published in 1981, still contains most of the plan, which is now broken into short phrases and scattered around the second book.

An earlier version of the plan can also be found in a 1965 novel by Soviet writer Yuri Dol'd-Mikhaylik, where another villain, one "General Dumbright" (Russian: генерал Думбрайт), proposes a similar course of action: "We shall arm comedians with jokes that laugh out their present and future. (...) Poison the soul of the youth with disbelief in their purpose in life, awaken their interest in sexual problems, bait them with such lures of the free world as fancy dances, pretty clothing, special records, verses, songs... (...) Sow discord between the youth and the older generation..." In the story, General Dumbright participates in an attempt to sign a separate peace between the Western Allies and Nazi Germany during World War II, which may have been the reason Allen Dulles was used as the real life counterpart of Dold-Mikhaylik's character (see Operation Sunrise). Another possibility is a confusion with John Foster Dulles and his proposed anti-communist "Rollback" policy, which is sometimes referred to as the "Dulles Doctrine".

The text by Ivanov also shows significant similarities to the statements of Pyotr Verhovensky, a character from the 1871 novel The Possessed by Fyodor Dostoyevsky: "...we'll make use of drunkenness, slander, spying; we'll make use of incredible corruption; we'll stifle every genius in its infancy. (...) But one or two generations of vice are essential now; monstrous, abject vice by which a man is transformed into a loathsome, cruel, egoistic reptile. That's what we need!" (Chapter VII).

The plan's imperatives (corrupt the young, control the media, discredit the government, etc.) are remarkably similar to the debunked "Communist Rules for Revolution," supposedly discovered in Germany in 1919 and published in English newspapers in 1946.

== Ban in Russia ==
In June 2015, a local court in Russia deemed the content of the Dulles' plan "extremist material" and banned its publication or distribution in Russia after a number of residents in Asbest received it in their mailboxes.

== See also ==
- Cultural Marxism conspiracy theory
- Peaceful Evolution theory
- The Protocols of the Elders of Zion
- Yuri Bezmenov
