= Boris Kuznetsov (philosopher) =

Russian philosopher (1903-1984)

- Бори́с Григо́рьевич Кузнецо́в
- Born: 5 October 1903; Dnipro, the Russian Empire
- Died: 5 September 1984 (aged 80); Moscow, the USSR
- Citizenship: USSR
- Education: Oles Honchar Dnipro National University (1927)
- Scientific career
- Fields: philosophy of science

Boris Grigoryevich Kuznetsov (Russian: Бори́с Григо́рьевич Кузнецо́в; 5 October 1903 – 5 September 1984) was a Soviet philosopher and historian. In 1931, he was appointed Head of the research institute of the energy industry and electrification. In 1936, Boris Kuznetsov became deputy director of the Vavilov Institute for the History of Science and Technology.

== Publications ==
His biography of Einstein was published internationally across multiple editions and countries. The work received extensive critical commentary and is widely read by physicists and other professionals.

== Awards ==
He was awarded the State Stalin Prize and two Orders of the Red Banner of Labour.

== Literature ==
- Grigorian, Akhot (1979). "ON THE 75TH ANNIVERSARY OF BORIS KUZNETSOV" (PDF). Organon (15): 5–8.
- Френкель, В. Я. [in Russian] (1993). "Высоких званий не имел, но было имя (К 90-летию со дня рождения профессора Б. Г. Кузнецова)" [On the 90th anniversary of prof. Boris Kuznetsov's birth]. Herald of the Russian Academy of Sciences (in Russian) (10).
