= List of Nobel laureates =

Nobel laureates receive a gold medal together with a diploma and (as of 2023) 11 million SEK (roughly US$1.0 million, €0.95 million).

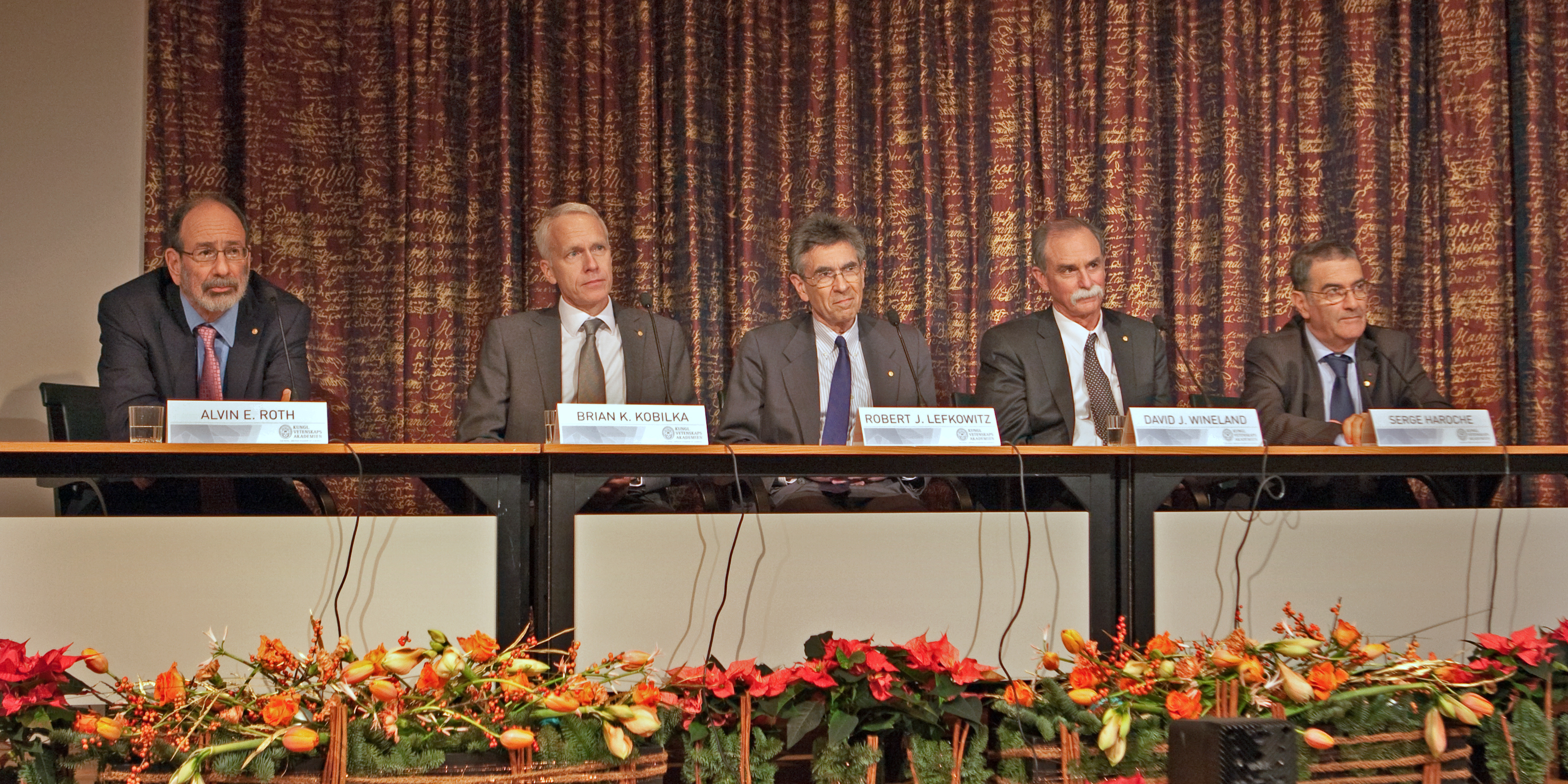
Nobel laureates of 2012 – Alvin E. Roth, Brian Kobilka, Robert Lefkowitz, David J. Wineland, and Serge Haroche – during the ceremony

The Nobel Prizes (Swedish: Nobelpriset, Norwegian: Nobelprisen) are awarded annually by the Royal Swedish Academy of Sciences, the Swedish Academy, the Karolinska Institutet, and the Norwegian Nobel Committee to individuals and organizations who make outstanding contributions in the fields of chemistry, physics, literature, peace, and physiology or medicine. They were established by the 1895 will of Alfred Nobel, which dictates that the awards should be administered by the Nobel Foundation. An additional prize in memory of Alfred Nobel was established in 1968 by Sveriges Riksbank (Sweden's central bank) for outstanding contributions to the field of economics. Each recipient, a Nobelist or laureate, receives a gold medal, a diploma, and a sum of money which is decided annually by the Nobel Foundation.

== Prize ==
Different organisations are responsible for awarding the individual prizes; the Royal Swedish Academy of Sciences awards the Prizes in Physics, Chemistry, and Economics; the Swedish Academy awards the Prize in Literature; the Karolinska Institute awards the Prize in Physiology or Medicine; and the Norwegian Nobel Committee awards the Prize in Peace. Each recipient receives a medal, a diploma and a monetary award that has varied throughout the years. In 1901, the recipients of the first Nobel Prizes were given 150,782 SEK, equivalent to 10.8 million SEK in 2023. In 2017, the laureates were awarded a prize amount of 9 million SEK. The awards are presented in Stockholm in an annual ceremony on 10 December, the anniversary of Nobel's death.

In years in which the Nobel Prize is not awarded due to external events or a lack of nominations, the prize money is returned to the funds delegated to the relevant prize. The Nobel Prize was not awarded between 1940 and 1942 due to the outbreak of World War II.

== Laureates ==
Between 1901 and 2017, the Nobel Prizes and the Nobel Memorial Prize in Economic Sciences were awarded 585 times to 923 people and organizations. With some receiving the Nobel Prize more than once, this makes a total of 892 individuals (including 844 men, 48 women) and 24 organizations. Six Nobel laureates were not permitted by their governments to accept the Nobel Prize. Adolf Hitler forbade four Germans, Richard Kuhn (Chemistry, 1938), Adolf Butenandt (Chemistry, 1939), Gerhard Domagk (Physiology or Medicine, 1939) and Carl von Ossietzky (Peace, 1936) from accepting their Nobel Prizes. The Chinese government forbade Liu Xiaobo from accepting his Nobel Prize (Peace, 2010) and the government of the Soviet Union pressured Boris Pasternak (Literature, 1958) to decline his award. Liu Xiaobo, Carl von Ossietzky and Aung San Suu Kyi were all awarded their Nobel Prize while in prison or detention. Two Nobel laureates, Jean-Paul Sartre (Literature, 1964) and Lê Ðức Thọ (Peace, 1973), declined the award; Sartre declined the award as he declined all official honors, and Thọ declined the award due to the war in Vietnam.

Seven laureates have received more than one prize; of the seven, the International Committee of the Red Cross has received the Nobel Peace Prize three times, more than any other. UNHCR (United Nations High Commissioner for Refugees) has been awarded the Nobel Peace Prize twice. Also the Nobel Prize in Physics was awarded to John Bardeen twice, as was the Nobel Prize in Chemistry to Frederick Sanger and Karl Barry Sharpless. Two laureates have been awarded twice but not in the same field: Marie Curie (Physics and Chemistry) and Linus Pauling (Chemistry and Peace). Among the 892 Nobel laureates, 48 have been women; the first woman to receive a Nobel Prize was Marie Curie, who received the Nobel Prize in Physics in 1903. She was also the first person to be awarded two Nobel Prizes, the second award being the Nobel Prize in Chemistry, given in 1911.

== List of laureates ==
list of laureates
Year	Physics	Chemistry	Physiology or Medicine	Literature	Peace	Economic Sciences (Note: The prize was established in 1968.)
1901	Wilhelm Röntgen	Jacobus Henricus van 't Hoff	Emil von Behring	Sully Prudhomme	Henry Dunant; Frédéric Passy	—
1902	Hendrik Lorentz; Pieter Zeeman	Emil Fischer	Ronald Ross	Theodor Mommsen	Élie Ducommun; Charles Albert Gobat	—
1903	Henri Becquerel; Pierre Curie; Marie Curie	Svante Arrhenius	Niels Ryberg Finsen	Bjørnstjerne Bjørnson	Randal Cremer	—
1904	Lord Rayleigh	William Ramsay	Ivan Pavlov	Frédéric Mistral; José Echegaray	Institut de Droit International	—
1905	Philipp Lenard	Adolf von Baeyer	Robert Koch	Henryk Sienkiewicz	Bertha von Suttner	—
1906	J. J. Thomson	Henri Moissan	Camillo Golgi; Santiago Ramón y Cajal	Giosuè Carducci	Theodore Roosevelt	—
1907	Albert A. Michelson	Eduard Buchner	Charles Louis Alphonse Laveran	Rudyard Kipling	Ernesto Teodoro Moneta; Louis Renault	—
1908	Gabriel Lippmann	Ernest Rutherford	Élie Metchnikoff; Paul Ehrlich	Rudolf Christoph Eucken	Klas Pontus Arnoldson; Fredrik Bajer	—
1909	Karl Ferdinand Braun; Guglielmo Marconi	Wilhelm Ostwald	Emil Theodor Kocher	Selma Lagerlöf	Auguste Beernaert; Paul Henri Balluet d'Estournelles de Constant	—
1910	Johannes Diderik van der Waals	Otto Wallach	Albrecht Kossel	Paul Heyse	International Peace Bureau	—
1911	Wilhelm Wien	Marie Curie (2)	Allvar Gullstrand	Maurice Maeterlinck	Tobias Asser; Alfred Hermann Fried	—
1912	Gustaf Dalén	Victor Grignard; Paul Sabatier	Alexis Carrel	Gerhart Hauptmann	Elihu Root	—
1913	Heike Kamerlingh Onnes	Alfred Werner	Charles Richet	Rabindranath Tagore	Henri La Fontaine	—
1914	Max von Laue	Theodore William Richards	Robert Bárány	None	None	—
1915	William Henry Bragg; Lawrence Bragg	Richard Willstätter	None	Romain Rolland	None	—
1916	None	None	None	Verner von Heidenstam	None	—
1917	Charles Glover Barkla	None	None	Karl Adolph Gjellerup; Henrik Pontoppidan	International Committee of the Red Cross	—
1918	Max Planck	Fritz Haber	None	None	None	—
1919	Johannes Stark	None	Jules Bordet	Carl Spitteler	Woodrow Wilson	—
1920	Charles Édouard Guillaume	Walther Nernst	August Krogh	Knut Hamsun	Léon Bourgeois	—
1921	Albert Einstein	Frederick Soddy	None	Anatole France	Hjalmar Branting; Christian Lous Lange	—
1922	Niels Bohr	Francis William Aston	Archibald Hill; Otto Fritz Meyerhof	Jacinto Benavente	Fridtjof Nansen	—
1923	Robert Andrews Millikan	Fritz Pregl	Frederick Banting; John Macleod	W. B. Yeats	None	—
1924	Manne Siegbahn	None	Willem Einthoven	Władysław Reymont	None	—
1925	James Franck; Gustav Ludwig Hertz	Richard Adolf Zsigmondy	None	George Bernard Shaw	Austen Chamberlain; Charles G. Dawes	—
1926	Jean Baptiste Perrin	Theodor Svedberg	Johannes Fibiger	Grazia Deledda	Aristide Briand; Gustav Stresemann	—
1927	Arthur Compton; Charles Thomson Rees Wilson	Heinrich Otto Wieland	Julius Wagner-Jauregg	Henri Bergson	Ferdinand Buisson; Ludwig Quidde	—
1928	Owen Willans Richardson	Adolf Windaus	Charles Nicolle	Sigrid Undset	None	—
1929	Louis de Broglie	Arthur Harden; Hans von Euler-Chelpin	Christiaan Eijkman; Frederick Gowland Hopkins	Thomas Mann	Frank B. Kellogg	—
1930	C. V. Raman	Hans Fischer	Karl Landsteiner	Sinclair Lewis	Nathan Söderblom	—
1931	None	Carl Bosch; Friedrich Bergius	Otto Heinrich Warburg	Erik Axel Karlfeldt	Jane Addams; Nicholas Murray Butler	—
1932	Werner Heisenberg	Irving Langmuir	Charles Scott Sherrington; Edgar Adrian	John Galsworthy	None	—
1933	Erwin Schrödinger; Paul Dirac	None	Thomas Hunt Morgan	Ivan Bunin	Norman Angell	—
1934	None	Harold Urey	George Whipple; George Minot; William P. Murphy	Luigi Pirandello	Arthur Henderson	—
1935	James Chadwick	Frédéric Joliot-Curie; Irène Joliot-Curie	Hans Spemann	None	Carl von Ossietzky	—
1936	Victor Francis Hess; Carl David Anderson	Peter Debye	Henry Hallett Dale; Otto Loewi	Eugene O'Neill	Carlos Saavedra Lamas	—
1937	Clinton Davisson; George Paget Thomson	Norman Haworth; Paul Karrer	Albert Szent-Györgyi	Roger Martin du Gard	Robert Cecil, 1st Viscount Cecil of Chelwood	—
1938	Enrico Fermi	Richard Kuhn (Note: In 1938 and 1939, the government of Germany did not allow three German Nobel nominees to accept their Nobel Prizes. The three were Richard Kuhn, Nobel laureate in Chemistry in 1938; Adolf Butenandt, Nobel laureate in Chemistry in 1939; and Gerhard Domagk, Nobel laureate in Physiology or Medicine in 1939. They were later awarded the Nobel Prize diploma and medal, but not the money.)	Corneille Heymans	Pearl S. Buck	Nansen International Office for Refugees	—
1939	Ernest Lawrence	Adolf Butenandt; Leopold Ružička	Gerhard Domagk	Frans Eemil Sillanpää	None	—
1940	Cancelled due to World War II					—
1941	Cancelled due to World War II					—
1942	Cancelled due to World War II					—
1943	Otto Stern	George de Hevesy	Henrik Dam; Edward Adelbert Doisy	None	None	—
1944	Isidor Isaac Rabi	Otto Hahn	Joseph Erlanger; Herbert Spencer Gasser	Johannes V. Jensen	International Committee of the Red Cross (2)	—
1945	Wolfgang Pauli	Artturi Ilmari Virtanen	Alexander Fleming; Ernst Chain; Howard Florey	Gabriela Mistral	Cordell Hull	—
1946	Percy Williams Bridgman	James B. Sumner; John Howard Northrop; Wendell Meredith Stanley	Hermann Joseph Muller	Hermann Hesse	Emily Greene Balch; John Mott	—
1947	Edward Victor Appleton	Robert Robinson	Carl Ferdinand Cori; Gerty Cori; Bernardo Houssay	André Gide	Friends Service Council; American Friends Service Committee	—
1948	Patrick Blackett	Arne Tiselius	Paul Hermann Müller	T. S. Eliot	None (Note: In 1948, the Nobel Prize in Peace was not awarded. The Nobel Foundation's website suggests that it would have been awarded to Mohandas Karamchand Gandhi. However, due to his assassination earlier that year, it was left unassigned in his honor.)	—
1949	Hideki Yukawa	William Giauque	Walter Rudolf Hess; António Egas Moniz	William Faulkner	John Boyd Orr	—
1950	C. F. Powell	Otto Diels; Kurt Alder	Philip Showalter Hench; Edward Calvin Kendall; Tadeus Reichstein	Bertrand Russell	Ralph Bunche	—
1951	John Cockcroft; Ernest Walton	Edwin McMillan; Glenn T. Seaborg	Max Theiler	Pär Lagerkvist	Léon Jouhaux	—
1952	Felix Bloch; Edward Mills Purcell	Archer Martin; Richard Laurence Millington Synge	Selman Waksman	François Mauriac	Albert Schweitzer	—
1953	Frits Zernike	Hermann Staudinger	Hans Adolf Krebs; Fritz Albert Lipmann	Winston Churchill	George Marshall	—
1954	Max Born; Walther Bothe	Linus Pauling	John Franklin Enders; Frederick Chapman Robbins; Thomas Huckle Weller	Ernest Hemingway	United Nations High Commissioner for Refugees	—
1955	Willis Lamb; Polykarp Kusch	Vincent du Vigneaud	Hugo Theorell	Halldór Laxness	None	—
1956	John Bardeen; Walter Houser Brattain; William Shockley	Cyril Norman Hinshelwood; Nikolay Semyonov	André Frédéric Cournand; Werner Forssmann; Dickinson W. Richards	Juan Ramón Jiménez	None	—
1957	Yang Chen-Ning; Tsung-Dao Lee	The Lord Todd	Daniel Bovet	Albert Camus	Lester B. Pearson	—
1958	Pavel Cherenkov; Ilya Frank; Igor Tamm	Frederick Sanger	George Beadle; Edward Tatum; Joshua Lederberg	Boris Pasternak (Note: In 1958, Russian-born Boris Pasternak, under pressure from the government of the Soviet Union, was forced to decline the Nobel Prize in Literature.)	Dominique Pire	—
1959	Emilio Segrè; Owen Chamberlain	Jaroslav Heyrovský	Arthur Kornberg; Severo Ochoa	Salvatore Quasimodo	Philip Noel-Baker	—
1960	Donald A. Glaser	Willard Libby	Macfarlane Burnet; Peter Medawar	Saint-John Perse	Albert Luthuli	—
1961	Robert Hofstadter; Rudolf Mössbauer	Melvin Calvin	Georg von Békésy	Ivo Andrić	Dag Hammarskjöld	—
1962	Lev Landau	Max Perutz; John Kendrew	Francis Crick; James Watson; Maurice Wilkins	John Steinbeck	Linus Pauling (2)	—
1963	Eugene Wigner; Maria Goeppert Mayer; J. Hans D. Jensen	Karl Ziegler; Giulio Natta	John Eccles; Alan Hodgkin; Andrew Huxley	Giorgos Seferis	International Committee of the Red Cross (3); League of Red Cross societies	—
1964	Charles H. Townes; Nikolay Basov; Alexander Prokhorov	Dorothy Hodgkin	Konrad Emil Bloch; Feodor Lynen	Jean-Paul Sartre (Note: In 1964, Jean-Paul Sartre refused to accept the Nobel Prize in Literature, as he had consistently refused all official honors in the past.)	Martin Luther King Jr.	—
1965	Shin'ichirō Tomonaga; Julian Schwinger; Richard Feynman	Robert Burns Woodward	François Jacob; André Michel Lwoff; Jacques Monod	Mikhail Sholokhov	United Nations International Children's Emergency Fund	—
1966	Alfred Kastler	Robert S. Mulliken	Francis Peyton Rous; Charles Brenton Huggins	Shmuel Yosef Agnon; Nelly Sachs	None	—
1967	Hans Bethe	Manfred Eigen; Ronald George Wreyford Norrish; George Porter	Ragnar Granit; Haldan Keffer Hartline; George Wald	Miguel Ángel Asturias	None	—
1968	Luis Walter Alvarez	Lars Onsager	Robert W. Holley; Har Gobind Khorana; Marshall Warren Nirenberg	Yasunari Kawabata	René Cassin	—
1969	Murray Gell-Mann	Derek Barton; Odd Hassel	Max Delbrück; Alfred Hershey; Salvador Luria	Samuel Beckett	International Labour Organization	Ragnar Frisch; Jan Tinbergen
1970	Hannes Alfvén; Louis Néel	Luis Federico Leloir	Julius Axelrod; Ulf von Euler; Bernard Katz	Aleksandr Solzhenitsyn	Norman Borlaug	Paul Samuelson
1971	Dennis Gabor	Gerhard Herzberg	Earl Wilbur Sutherland Jr.	Pablo Neruda	Willy Brandt	Simon Kuznets
1972	John Bardeen (2); Leon Cooper; John Robert Schrieffer	Christian B. Anfinsen; Stanford Moore; William Howard Stein	Gerald Edelman; Rodney Robert Porter	Heinrich Böll	None	John Hicks; Kenneth Arrow
1973	Leo Esaki; Ivar Giaever; Brian Josephson	Ernst Otto Fischer; Geoffrey Wilkinson	Karl von Frisch; Konrad Lorenz; Nikolaas Tinbergen	Patrick White	Henry Kissinger; Lê Đức Thọ (Note: In 1973, Lê Đức Thọ declined the Nobel Peace Prize. His reason was that he felt he did not deserve it because although he helped negotiate the Paris Peace Accords (a cease-fire in the Vietnam War), there had been no actual peace agreement.)	Wassily Leontief
1974	Martin Ryle; Antony Hewish	Paul Flory	Albert Claude; Christian de Duve; George Emil Palade	Eyvind Johnson; Harry Martinson	Seán MacBride; Eisaku Satō	Gunnar Myrdal; Friedrich Hayek
1975	Aage Bohr; Ben Roy Mottelson; James Rainwater	John Cornforth; Vladimir Prelog	David Baltimore; Renato Dulbecco; Howard Martin Temin	Eugenio Montale	Andrei Sakharov	Leonid Kantorovich; Tjalling Koopmans
1976	Burton Richter; Samuel C. C. Ting	William Lipscomb	Baruch Samuel Blumberg; Daniel Carleton Gajdusek	Saul Bellow	Betty Williams; Mairead Maguire	Milton Friedman
1977	Philip W. Anderson; Nevill Francis Mott; John Hasbrouck Van Vleck	Ilya Prigogine	Roger Guillemin; Andrew Schally; Rosalyn Sussman Yalow	Vicente Aleixandre	Amnesty International	Bertil Ohlin; James Meade
1978	Pyotr Kapitsa; Arno Allan Penzias; Robert Woodrow Wilson	Peter D. Mitchell	Werner Arber; Daniel Nathans; Hamilton O. Smith	Isaac Bashevis Singer	Anwar Sadat; Menachem Begin	Herbert A. Simon
1979	Sheldon Glashow; Abdus Salam; Steven Weinberg	Herbert C. Brown; Georg Wittig	Allan McLeod Cormack; Godfrey Hounsfield	Odysseas Elytis	Mother Teresa	Theodore Schultz; W. Arthur Lewis
1980	James Cronin; Val Logsdon Fitch	Paul Berg; Walter Gilbert; Frederick Sanger (2)	Baruj Benacerraf; Jean Dausset; George Davis Snell	Czesław Miłosz	Adolfo Pérez Esquivel	Lawrence Klein
1981	Nicolaas Bloembergen; Arthur Leonard Schawlow; Kai Siegbahn	Kenichi Fukui; Roald Hoffmann	Roger Wolcott Sperry; David H. Hubel; Torsten Wiesel	Elias Canetti	United Nations High Commissioner for Refugees (2)	James Tobin
1982	Kenneth G. Wilson	Aaron Klug	Sune Bergström; Bengt I. Samuelsson; John Vane	Gabriel García Márquez	Alva Myrdal; Alfonso García Robles	George Stigler
1983	Subrahmanyan Chandrasekhar; William Alfred Fowler	Henry Taube	Barbara McClintock	William Golding	Lech Wałęsa	Gérard Debreu
1984	Carlo Rubbia; Simon van der Meer	Robert Bruce Merrifield	Niels Kaj Jerne; Georges J. F. Köhler; César Milstein	Jaroslav Seifert	Desmond Tutu	Richard Stone
1985	Klaus von Klitzing	Herbert A. Hauptman; Jerome Karle	Michael Stuart Brown; Joseph L. Goldstein	Claude Simon	International Physicians for the Prevention of Nuclear War	Franco Modigliani
1986	Ernst Ruska; Gerd Binnig; Heinrich Rohrer	Dudley R. Herschbach; Yuan T. Lee; John Polanyi	Stanley Cohen; Rita Levi-Montalcini	Wole Soyinka	Elie Wiesel	James M. Buchanan
1987	Georg Bednorz; K. Alex Müller	Donald J. Cram; Jean-Marie Lehn; Charles J. Pedersen	Susumu Tonegawa	Joseph Brodsky	Óscar Arias	Robert Solow
1988	Leon M. Lederman; Melvin Schwartz; Jack Steinberger	Johann Deisenhofer; Robert Huber; Hartmut Michel	James W. Black; Gertrude B. Elion; George H. Hitchings	Naguib Mahfouz	United Nations peacekeeping forces	Maurice Allais
1989	Norman Ramsey Jr.; Hans Georg Dehmelt; Wolfgang Paul	Sidney Altman; Thomas Cech	J. Michael Bishop; Harold E. Varmus	Camilo José Cela	Tenzin Gyatso (The 14th Dalai Lama)	Trygve Haavelmo
1990	Jerome Isaac Friedman; Henry Way Kendall; Richard E. Taylor	Elias James Corey	Joseph Murray; E. Donnall Thomas	Octavio Paz	Mikhail Gorbachev	Harry Markowitz; Merton Miller; William F. Sharpe
1991	Pierre-Gilles de Gennes	Richard R. Ernst	Erwin Neher; Bert Sakmann	Nadine Gordimer	Aung San Suu Kyi	Ronald Coase
1992	Georges Charpak	Rudolph A. Marcus	Edmond H. Fischer; Edwin G. Krebs	Derek Walcott	Rigoberta Menchú	Gary Becker
1993	Russell Alan Hulse; Joseph Hooton Taylor Jr.	Kary Mullis; Michael Smith	Richard J. Roberts; Phillip Allen Sharp	Toni Morrison	Nelson Mandela; F. W. de Klerk	Robert Fogel; Douglass North
1994	Bertram Brockhouse; Clifford Shull	George Andrew Olah	Alfred G. Gilman; Martin Rodbell	Kenzaburō Ōe	Yasser Arafat; Shimon Peres; Yitzhak Rabin	John Harsanyi; John Forbes Nash Jr.; Reinhard Selten
1995	Martin Lewis Perl; Frederick Reines	Paul J. Crutzen; Mario J. Molina; F. Sherwood Rowland	Edward B. Lewis; Christiane Nüsslein-Volhard; Eric F. Wieschaus	Seamus Heaney	Joseph Rotblat; Pugwash Conferences on Science and World Affairs	Robert Lucas Jr.
1996	David Lee; Douglas Osheroff; Robert Coleman Richardson	Robert Curl; Harry Kroto; Richard Smalley	Peter C. Doherty; Rolf M. Zinkernagel	Wisława Szymborska	Carlos Filipe Ximenes Belo; José Ramos-Horta	James Mirrlees; William Vickrey
1997	Steven Chu; Claude Cohen-Tannoudji; William Daniel Phillips	Paul D. Boyer; John E. Walker; Jens Christian Skou	Stanley B. Prusiner	Dario Fo	International Campaign to Ban Landmines; Jody Williams	Robert C. Merton; Myron Scholes
1998	Robert B. Laughlin; Horst Ludwig Störmer; Daniel C. Tsui	Walter Kohn; John Pople	Robert F. Furchgott; Louis Ignarro; Ferid Murad	José Saramago	John Hume; David Trimble	Amartya Sen
1999	Gerard 't Hooft; Martinus J. G. Veltman	Ahmed Zewail	Günter Blobel	Günter Grass	Médecins Sans Frontières	Robert Mundell
2000	Jack Kilby; Zhores Alferov; Herbert Kroemer	Alan J. Heeger; Alan MacDiarmid; Hideki Shirakawa	Arvid Carlsson; Paul Greengard; Eric Kandel	Gao Xingjian	Kim Dae-jung	James Heckman; Daniel McFadden
2001	Eric Allin Cornell; Wolfgang Ketterle; Carl Wieman	William Standish Knowles; Ryōji Noyori; Karl Barry Sharpless	Leland H. Hartwell; Tim Hunt; Paul Nurse	V. S. Naipaul	United Nations; Kofi Annan	George Akerlof; Michael Spence; Joseph Stiglitz
2002	Riccardo Giacconi; Raymond Davis Jr.; Masatoshi Koshiba	John B. Fenn; Koichi Tanaka; Kurt Wüthrich	Sydney Brenner; H. Robert Horvitz; John Sulston	Imre Kertész	Jimmy Carter	Daniel Kahneman; Vernon L. Smith
2003	Alexei Abrikosov; Vitaly Ginzburg; Anthony James Leggett	Peter Agre; Roderick MacKinnon	Paul Lauterbur; Peter Mansfield	J. M. Coetzee	Shirin Ebadi	Robert F. Engle; Clive Granger
2004	David Gross; Hugh David Politzer; Frank Wilczek	Aaron Ciechanover; Avram Hershko; Irwin Rose	Richard Axel; Linda B. Buck	Elfriede Jelinek	Wangari Maathai	Finn E. Kydland; Edward C. Prescott
2005	Roy J. Glauber; John L. Hall; Theodor W. Hänsch	Yves Chauvin; Robert H. Grubbs; Richard R. Schrock	Barry Marshall; Robin Warren	Harold Pinter	International Atomic Energy Agency; Mohamed ElBaradei	Robert Aumann; Thomas Schelling
2006	John C. Mather; George Smoot	Roger D. Kornberg	Andrew Fire; Craig Mello	Orhan Pamuk	Muhammad Yunus; Grameen Bank	Edmund Phelps
2007	Albert Fert; Peter Grünberg	Gerhard Ertl	Mario Capecchi; Martin Evans; Oliver Smithies	Doris Lessing	Intergovernmental Panel on Climate Change; Al Gore	Leonid Hurwicz; Eric Maskin; Roger Myerson
2008	Yoichiro Nambu; Makoto Kobayashi; Toshihide Maskawa	Osamu Shimomura; Martin Chalfie; Roger Y. Tsien	Harald zur Hausen; Françoise Barré-Sinoussi; Luc Montagnier	J. M. G. Le Clézio	Martti Ahtisaari	Paul Krugman
2009	Charles K. Kao; Willard S. Boyle; George E. Smith	Venkatraman Ramakrishnan; Thomas A. Steitz; Ada Yonath	Elizabeth Blackburn; Carol W. Greider; Jack W. Szostak	Herta Müller	Barack Obama	Elinor Ostrom; Oliver E. Williamson
2010	Andre Geim; Konstantin Novoselov	Richard F. Heck; Ei-ichi Negishi; Akira Suzuki	Robert Edwards	Mario Vargas Llosa	Liu Xiaobo (Note: In 2010, Liu Xiaobo was unable to receive the Nobel Peace Prize as he was sentenced to 11 years of imprisonment by the Chinese authorities.)	Peter A. Diamond; Dale T. Mortensen; Christopher A. Pissarides
2011	Saul Perlmutter; Adam Riess; Brian Schmidt	Dan Shechtman	Bruce Beutler; Jules A. Hoffmann; Ralph M. Steinman	Tomas Tranströmer	Ellen Johnson Sirleaf; Leymah Gbowee; Tawakel Karman	Thomas J. Sargent; Christopher A. Sims
2012	Serge Haroche; David J. Wineland	Brian K. Kobilka; Robert J. Lefkowitz	John B. Gurdon; Shinya Yamanaka	Mo Yan	European Union	Alvin E. Roth; Lloyd S. Shapley
2013	François Englert; Peter W. Higgs	Martin Karplus; Michael Levitt; Arieh Warshel	James E. Rothman; Randy W. Schekman; Thomas C. Südhof	Alice Munro	Organisation for the Prohibition of Chemical Weapons	Eugene F. Fama; Lars Peter Hansen; Robert J. Shiller
2014	Isamu Akasaki; Hiroshi Amano; Shuji Nakamura	Eric Betzig; Stefan Hell; William Moerner	John O'Keefe; May-Britt Moser; Edvard Moser	Patrick Modiano	Kailash Satyarthi; Malala Yousafzai	Jean Tirole
2015	Takaaki Kajita; Arthur B. McDonald	Tomas Lindahl; Paul L. Modrich; Aziz Sancar	William C. Campbell; Satoshi Ōmura; Tu Youyou	Svetlana Alexievich	Tunisian National Dialogue Quartet	Angus Deaton
2016	David J. Thouless; Duncan Haldane; John M. Kosterlitz	Jean-Pierre Sauvage; Fraser Stoddart; Ben Feringa	Yoshinori Ohsumi	Bob Dylan	Juan Manuel Santos	Oliver Hart; Bengt R. Holmström
2017	Rainer Weiss; Barry Barish; Kip Thorne	Jacques Dubochet; Joachim Frank; Richard Henderson	Jeffrey C. Hall; Michael Rosbash; Michael W. Young	Kazuo Ishiguro	International Campaign to Abolish Nuclear Weapons	Richard Thaler
2018	Arthur Ashkin; Gérard Mourou; Donna Strickland	Frances H. Arnold; George Smith; Greg Winter	James P. Allison; Tasuku Honjo	Olga Tokarczuk (Note: The 2018 Nobel Prize in Literature was awarded in 2019, as scandals within the Swedish Academy forced it to postpone the ceremony.)	Denis Mukwege; Nadia Murad	William Nordhaus; Paul Romer
2019	Jim Peebles; Michel Mayor; Didier Queloz	John B. Goodenough; M. Stanley Whittingham; Akira Yoshino	William Kaelin Jr.; Peter J. Ratcliffe; Gregg L. Semenza	Peter Handke	Abiy Ahmed	Abhijit Banerjee; Esther Duflo; Michael Kremer
2020	Roger Penrose; Reinhard Genzel; Andrea M. Ghez	Emmanuelle Charpentier; Jennifer Doudna	Harvey J. Alter; Michael Houghton; Charles M. Rice	Louise Glück	World Food Programme	Paul Milgrom; Robert B. Wilson
2021	Giorgio Parisi; Klaus Hasselmann; Syukuro Manabe	Benjamin List; David MacMillan	David Julius; Ardem Patapoutian	Abdulrazak Gurnah	Maria Ressa; Dmitry Muratov	David Card; Joshua Angrist; Guido Imbens
2022	Alain Aspect; John Clauser; Anton Zeilinger	Carolyn Bertozzi; Morten P. Meldal; Karl Barry Sharpless (2)	Svante Pääbo	Annie Ernaux	Ales Bialiatski; Memorial; Centre for Civil Liberties	Ben Bernanke; Douglas Diamond; Philip H. Dybvig
2023	Pierre Agostini; Ferenc Krausz; Anne L'Huillier	Moungi Bawendi; Louis E. Brus; Alexey Ekimov	Katalin Karikó; Drew Weissman	Jon Fosse	Narges Mohammadi	Claudia Goldin
2024	John Hopfield; Geoffrey Hinton	David Baker; Demis Hassabis; John M. Jumper	Victor Ambros; Gary Ruvkun	Han Kang	Nihon Hidankyo	Daron Acemoglu; Simon Johnson; James A. Robinson
2025	John Clarke; Michel H. Devoret; John M. Martinis	Susumu Kitagawa; Richard Robson; Omar M. Yaghi	Mary E. Brunkow; Fred Ramsdell; Shimon Sakaguchi	László Krasznahorkai	María Corina Machado	Joel Mokyr; Philippe Aghion; Peter Howitt
2026	Francis Halzen	Henri B. Kagan; Kensō Soai	Karl Deisseroth; Peter Hegemann; Georg Nagel	Anne Carson	Navi Pillay	Robert E. Hall; Michael Woodford

== 50-year secrecy rule ==
The Committee neither informs the media nor the candidates themselves of the names of the nominees. Insofar as specific names frequently appear in the early predictions of who will receive the award in any given year, this is either pure speculation or inside information from the person or people who submitted the nomination. After fifty years, the database of nominations maintained by the Nobel Committee is made available to the public. Statutes of the Nobel Foundation, § 10, states:

A prize-awarding body may, however, after due consideration in each individual case, permit access to material which formed the basis for the evaluation and decision concerning a prize, for purposes of research in intellectual history. Such permission may not, however, be granted until at least 50 years have elapsed after the date on which the decision in question was made.

== See also ==
- List of Nobel laureates by country
- List of Nobel laureates by university affiliation
- List of female Nobel laureates
- List of nominees for the Nobel Prize in Literature
- List of nominees for the Nobel Prize in Chemistry
- List of nominees for the Nobel Prize in Physics
- List of female nominees for the Nobel Prize
- List of individuals nominated for the Nobel Peace Prize
- List of organizations nominated for the Nobel Peace Prize
