= 2014 Nobel Prizes =

The 2014 Nobel Prizes were awarded by the Nobel Foundation, based in Sweden. Six categories were awarded: Physics, Chemistry, Physiology or Medicine, Literature, Peace, and Economic Sciences.

Nobel Week took place from December 6 to 12, including programming such as lectures, dialogues, and discussions. The award ceremony and banquet for the Peace Prize were scheduled in Oslo on December 10, while the award ceremony and banquet for all other categories were scheduled for the same day in Stockholm.

== Prizes ==
=== Physics ===
Awardee(s)
Isamu Akasaki (1929–2021)	Japanese	"for the invention of efficient blue light-emitting diodes which has enabled bright and energy-saving white light sources"
Hiroshi Amano (b. 1960)	Japanese	"for the invention of efficient blue light-emitting diodes which has enabled bright and energy-saving white light sources"
Shuji Nakamura (b. 1954)	Japanese American	"for the invention of efficient blue light-emitting diodes which has enabled bright and energy-saving white light sources"

=== Chemistry ===
Awardee(s)
Eric Betzig (b. 1960)	American	"for the development of super-resolved fluorescence microscopy"
Stefan W. Hell (b. 1962)	Romanian German	"for the development of super-resolved fluorescence microscopy"
William E. Moerner (b. 1953)	American	"for the development of super-resolved fluorescence microscopy"

=== Physiology or Medicine ===
Awardee(s)
John O'Keefe (b. 1939)	United States United Kingdom	"for their discoveries of cells that constitute a positioning system in the brain"
May-Britt Moser (b. 1963)	Norway	"for their discoveries of cells that constitute a positioning system in the brain"
Edvard I. Moser (b. 1962)	Norway	"for their discoveries of cells that constitute a positioning system in the brain"

=== Literature ===
Awardee(s)		
Patrick Modiano (b. 1945)	France	"for the art of memory with which he has evoked the most ungraspable human destinies and uncovered the life-world of the Occupation"

=== Peace ===
Awardee(s)
Kailash Satyarthi (born 1954)	India	"for their struggle against the suppression of children and young people and for the right of all children to education."
Malala Yousafzai (born 1997)	Pakistan	"for their struggle against the suppression of children and young people and for the right of all children to education."

=== Economic Sciences ===
Awardee(s)
Jean Tirole (b. 1953)	France	"for his analysis of market power and regulation"

== Controversies ==
=== Physics ===
Some questioned the award's lack of recognition for other scientists who helped pioneer light-emitting diodes such as Oleg Losev, Nick Holonyak, Gertrude Neumark. In particular, it was mentioned that materials scientist Herbert Paul Maruska could be credited with first developing the blue LED.
