= 2021 Nobel Prizes =

The 2021 Nobel Prizes were awarded by the Nobel Foundation, based in Sweden. Six categories were awarded: Physics, Chemistry, Physiology or Medicine, Literature, Peace, and Economic Sciences.

Nobel Week took place from December 6 to 12, including programming such as lectures, dialogues, and discussions. The award ceremony and banquet for the Peace Prize were scheduled in Oslo on December 10, while the award ceremony and banquet for all other categories were scheduled for the same day in Stockholm.

== Prizes ==
=== Physics ===
Awardee(s)
| Syukuro Manabe (b. 1931) | Japanese American | "for the physical modelling of Earth's climate, quantifying variability and reliably predicting global warming" |
| Klaus Hasselmann (b. 1931) | German | "for the physical modelling of Earth's climate, quantifying variability and reliably predicting global warming" |
| Giorgio Parisi (b. 1948) | Italian | "for the discovery of the interplay of disorder and fluctuations in physical systems from atomic to planetary scales" |

=== Chemistry ===
Awardee(s)
| Benjamin List (b. 1968) | German | "for the development of asymmetric organocatalysis" |
| David W.C. MacMillan (b. 1968) | British | "for the development of asymmetric organocatalysis" |

=== Physiology or Medicine ===
Awardee(s)
| David Julius (b. 1955) | United States | "for the discovery of receptors for temperature and touch" |
| Ardem Patapoutian (b. 1967) | Lebanon United States | "for the discovery of receptors for temperature and touch" |

=== Literature ===
| Awardee(s) | | |
|---|---|---|
| Abdulrazak Gurnah (b. 1948) | Tanzania United Kingdom (born in the Sultanate of Zanzibar) | "for his uncompromising and compassionate penetration of the effects of colonialism and the fate of the refugee in the gulf between cultures and continents" |

=== Peace ===
Awardee(s)
| Maria Ressa (b. 1963) | Philippines United States | "for their efforts to safeguard freedom of expression, which is a precondition for democracy and lasting peace." |
| Dmitry Muratov (b. 1961) | Russia | "for their efforts to safeguard freedom of expression, which is a precondition for democracy and lasting peace." |

=== Economic Sciences ===
Awardee(s)
| David Card (b. 1956) | Canada United States | "for his empirical contributions to labour economics" |
| Joshua Angrist (b. 1960) | United States Israel | "for their methodological contributions to the analysis of causal relationships" |
| Guido Imbens (b. 1963) | United States Netherlands | "for their methodological contributions to the analysis of causal relationships" |

== Reactions ==
=== Physiology or Medicine ===
In announcing the winners, Thomas Perlmann, secretary-general of the Karolinska Institute, said: "This really unlocks one of the secrets of nature. It’s actually something that is crucial for our survival, so it’s a very important and profound discovery." The Nobel Committee believed that Julius and Patapoutian's discoveries address "one of the greatest mysteries facing humanity" – the sensation of the environment. Oscar Marín, director of the MRC Centre for Neurodevelopmental Disorders at King's College London, expressed that the choice of this year's winners underscored how little scientists knew about that question before the discoveries and how much there still is to learn.

Jan Adams, chief officer at Grünenthal, which markets pain relief skin patches and creams based on the TRPV1 capsaicin receptor discovered by Julius, said their discoveries had "opened up a whole new field of research for new non-opioid pain therapies". Fiona Boissonade, pain specialist at the University of Sheffield, said the Nobel laureates' work was especially relevant for the one in five people globally that suffer from chronic pain. She said: "Their research may lead us to identify new compounds that are effective in treating pain that don't come with the devastating impact of opioids."
