= Martin Kaplan =

Martin Kaplan may refer to:

- Martin M. Kaplan (1915–2004), American virologist, veterinary scientist and public health official
- Marty Kaplan (born 1950), American professor and former studio executive and writer
