= 2004 Nobel Prizes =

The 2004 Nobel Prizes were awarded by the Nobel Foundation, based in Sweden. Six categories were awarded: Physics, Chemistry, Physiology or Medicine, Literature, Peace, and Economic Sciences.

Nobel Week took place from December 6 to 12, including programming such as lectures, dialogues, and discussions. The award ceremony and banquet for the Peace Prize were scheduled in Oslo on December 10, while the award ceremony and banquet for all other categories were scheduled for the same day in Stockholm.

== Prizes ==
=== Physics ===
Awardee(s)
David Gross (b. 1941)	American	"for the discovery of asymptotic freedom in the theory of the strong interaction"
Hugh David Politzer (b. 1949)	American	"for the discovery of asymptotic freedom in the theory of the strong interaction"
Frank Wilczek (b. 1951)	American	"for the discovery of asymptotic freedom in the theory of the strong interaction"

=== Chemistry ===
Awardee(s)
Aaron Ciechanover (b. 1947)	Israeli	"for the discovery of ubiquitin-mediated protein degradation"
Avram Hershko (b. 1937)	Israeli	"for the discovery of ubiquitin-mediated protein degradation"
Irwin Rose (1926–2015)	American	"for the discovery of ubiquitin-mediated protein degradation"

=== Physiology or Medicine ===
Awardee(s)
Richard Axel (b. 1946)	United States	"for their discoveries of odorant receptors and the organization of the olfactory system"
Linda B. Buck (b. 1947)	United States	"for their discoveries of odorant receptors and the organization of the olfactory system"

=== Literature ===
Awardee(s)		
Elfriede Jelinek (b. 1946)	Austria	"for her musical flow of voices and counter-voices in novels and plays that with extraordinary linguistic zeal reveal the absurdity of society's clichés and their subjugating power"

=== Peace ===
Awardee(s)
Wangari Muta Maathai (1940–2011)	Kenya	"for her contribution to sustainable development, democracy and peace."

=== Economic Sciences ===
Awardee(s)
Finn E. Kydland (b. 1943)	Norway	"for their contributions to dynamic macroeconomics: the time consistency of economic policy and the driving forces behind business cycles"
Edward C. Prescott (1940–2022)	United States	"for their contributions to dynamic macroeconomics: the time consistency of economic policy and the driving forces behind business cycles"

== Controversies ==
=== Peace ===
Maathai was criticized for her past comments—reported by the Kenyan newspaper The Standard and Radio Free Europe—stating that HIV/AIDS was developed by western scientists and unleashed upon Africa. Maathai denied having stated them, though The Standard stood by its reporting, and Maathai later hinted in a Time interview that she believed HIV had a non-natural origin, saying that someone knows where it came from and that it "did not come from monkeys".

=== Literature ===
Shortly before the 2005 Nobel Prizes, Nobel Foundation member Knut Ahnlund resigned and stated publicly that Jelinek's awarding of the 2004 Nobel Prize in Literature "caused irreparable harm to the value for the foreseeable future" due to Jelinek's "whingeing, unenjoyable, and violent pornography" in her work. Academy head Horace Engdahl later stated that Ahnlund's activity in the academy during and prior to the decision of Jilenek's awarding was minimal and that he thus hadn't been a part of prize deliberations whatsoever.
