= 1998 Nobel Prizes =

The 1998 Nobel Prizes were awarded by the Nobel Foundation, based in Sweden. Six categories were awarded: Physics, Chemistry, Physiology or Medicine, Literature, Peace, and Economic Sciences.

Nobel Week took place from December 6 to 12, including programming such as lectures, dialogues, and discussions. The award ceremony and banquet for the Peace Prize were scheduled in Oslo on December 10, while the award ceremony and banquet for all other categories were scheduled for the same day in Stockholm.

== Prizes ==
=== Physics ===
Awardee(s)
Robert B. Laughlin (b. 1950)	American	"for their discovery of a new form of quantum fluid with fractionally charged excitations"
Horst Ludwig Störmer (b. 1949)	German	"for their discovery of a new form of quantum fluid with fractionally charged excitations"
Daniel C. Tsui (b. 1939)	American	"for their discovery of a new form of quantum fluid with fractionally charged excitations"

=== Chemistry ===
Awardee(s)
Walter Kohn	Walter Kohn (1923–2016)	Austrian American	"for his development of the density-functional theory"
John Anthony Pople	John A. Pople (1925–2004)	British	"for his development of computational methods in quantum chemistry"

=== Physiology or Medicine ===
Awardee(s)
Robert F. Furchgott (1916–2009)	United States	"for their discoveries concerning nitric oxide as a signalling molecule in the cardiovascular system"
Louis J. Ignarro (b. 1941)	United States	"for their discoveries concerning nitric oxide as a signalling molecule in the cardiovascular system"
Ferid Murad (1936–2023)	United States	"for their discoveries concerning nitric oxide as a signalling molecule in the cardiovascular system"

=== Literature ===
Awardee(s)		
José Saramago (1922–2010)	Portugal	"who with parables sustained by imagination, compassion and irony continually enables us once again to apprehend an elusory reality"

=== Peace ===
Awardee(s)
John Hume (1937–2020)	Ireland	"for their efforts to find a peaceful solution to the conflict in Northern Ireland."
David Trimble (1944–2022)	United Kingdom	"for their efforts to find a peaceful solution to the conflict in Northern Ireland."

=== Economic Sciences ===
Awardee(s)
Amartya Sen (b. 1933)	India	"for his contributions to welfare economics"

== Controversies ==
=== Physiology or Medicine ===
The award provoked some outcry from the scientific community for not acknowledging Salvador Moncada, a scientist who significantly contributed to the awarded discoveries with Furchgott.
