= 2009 Nobel Prizes =

The 2009 Nobel Prizes were awarded by the Nobel Foundation, based in Sweden. Six categories were awarded: Physics, Chemistry, Physiology or Medicine, Literature, Peace, and Economic Sciences.

Nobel Week took place from December 6 to 12, including programming such as lectures, dialogues, and discussions. The award ceremony and banquet for the Peace Prize were scheduled in Oslo on December 10, while the award ceremony and banquet for all other categories were scheduled for the same day in Stockholm.

== Prizes ==
=== Physics ===
Awardee(s)
Charles K. Kao (1933–2018)	Chinese British	"for groundbreaking achievements concerning the transmission of light in fibers for optical communication"
Willard S. Boyle (1924–2011)	Canadian	"for the invention of an imaging semiconductor circuit—the CCD sensor"
George E. Smith (1930–2025)	American	"for the invention of an imaging semiconductor circuit—the CCD sensor"

=== Chemistry ===
Awardee(s)
Venkatraman Ramakrishnan (b. 1952)	British American	"for studies of the structure and function of the ribosome"
Thomas A. Steitz (1940–2018)	American	"for studies of the structure and function of the ribosome"
Ada E. Yonath (1939-2026)	Israeli	"for studies of the structure and function of the ribosome"

=== Physiology or Medicine ===
Awardee(s)
Elizabeth H. Blackburn (b. 1948)	Australia United States	"for the discovery of how chromosomes are protected by telomeres and the enzyme telomerase"
Carol W. Greider (b. 1961)	United States	"for the discovery of how chromosomes are protected by telomeres and the enzyme telomerase"
Jack W. Szostak (b. 1952)	Canada United States	"for the discovery of how chromosomes are protected by telomeres and the enzyme telomerase"

=== Literature ===
Awardee(s)		
Herta Müller (b. 1953)	Germany Romania	"who, with the concentration of poetry and the frankness of prose, depicts the landscape of the dispossessed"

=== Peace ===
Awardee(s)
Barack Obama (born 1961)	United States	"for his extraordinary efforts to strengthen international diplomacy and cooperation between peoples."

=== Economic Sciences ===
Awardee(s)
Elinor Ostrom (1933–2012)	United States	"for her analysis of economic governance, especially the commons"
Oliver E. Williamson (1932–2020)	United States	"for his analysis of economic governance, especially the boundaries of the firm"

== Controversies ==
=== Physics ===
The 2009 Nobel Prize in Physics was divided between three recipients over two disciplines, fiber optics and charge-coupled devices. Combined with the limit of three awardees, this led to some omissions. Charles Kuen Kao's award for his work in fiber optics led to claims that Narinder Singh Kapany's previous work had been overlooked.

The second award topic was "for the invention of an imaging semiconductor circuit—the CCD sensor". The awardees, Willard Boyle and George E. Smith, developed the CCD, but for use as a memory. This led to Eugene I. Gordon and Michael Francis Tompsett claiming that it should have been theirs for establishing that the technology could be used for imaging, especially as "imaging" is part of the award description.

=== Peace ===
The Peace Prize's awarding to Obama drew widespread criticism on several counts. Polling data on American sentiments regarding its conferment were mixed, and several pointed out that Obama had only served nine months in the White House prior to receiving the prize and therefore it was undeserved or, at least, premature. Opinion across the world, among citizens of different countries as well as many heads of state, was divided. Many, such as those in the Los Angeles Times and The New York Times, saw it less as a celebration of Obama and more so a critique of the presidency of George W. Bush. Peter Beinart of the Daily Beast called the decision a "farce"; Noam Chomsky said: "In defense of the committee, we might say that the achievement of doing nothing to advance peace places Obama on a considerably higher moral plane than some of the earlier recipients". Some called the Nobel Foundation no longer credible.

Later, through Obama's terms as president, public opinion among Americans regarding his deservingness for the prize waned. Critics continued to cite the war on terror as an indictment of his award's citation. Some even called for it to be rescinded or returned. Geil Lundestad, the former director of the Nobel Foundation up until 2014, said in his 2015 memoir that Obama failed to live up to the Nobel Committee's expectations.
