= 2003 Nobel Prizes =

The 2003 Nobel Prizes were awarded by the Nobel Foundation, based in Sweden. Six categories were awarded: Physics, Chemistry, Physiology or Medicine, Literature, Peace, and Economic Sciences.

Nobel Week took place from December 6 to 12, including programming such as lectures, dialogues, and discussions. The award ceremony and banquet for the Peace Prize were scheduled in Oslo on December 10, while the award ceremony and banquet for all other categories were scheduled for the same day in Stockholm.

== Prizes ==
=== Physics ===
Awardee(s)
Alexei Alexeyevich Abrikosov (1928–2017)	Russian American	"for pioneering contributions to the theory of superconductors and superfluids"
Vitaly Ginzburg (1916–2009)	Russian	"for pioneering contributions to the theory of superconductors and superfluids"
Anthony James Leggett (1938–2026)	British American	"for pioneering contributions to the theory of superconductors and superfluids"

=== Chemistry ===
Awardee(s)
	Peter Agre (b. 1949)	American	"for discoveries concerning channels in cell membranes [...] for the discovery of water channels"
Roderick MacKinnon	Roderick MacKinnon (b. 1956)	American	"for discoveries concerning channels in cell membranes [...] for structural and mechanistic studies of ion channels"

=== Physiology or Medicine ===
Awardee(s)
Paul Lauterbur (1929–2007)	United States	"for their discoveries concerning magnetic resonance imaging"
Sir Peter Mansfield (1933–2017)	United Kingdom	"for their discoveries concerning magnetic resonance imaging"

=== Literature ===
Awardee(s)		
John Maxwell Coetzee (b. 1940)	South Africa	"who in innumerable guises portrays the surprising involvement of the outsider"

=== Peace ===
Awardee(s)
Shirin Ebadi (born 1947)	Iran	"for her efforts for democracy and human rights. She has focused especially on the rights of women and children."

=== Economic Sciences ===
Awardee(s)
Robert F. Engle (b. 1942)	United States	"for methods of analyzing economic time series with time-varying volatility (ARCH)"
Clive Granger (1934–2009)	United Kingdom	"for methods of analyzing economic time series with common trends (cointegration)"

== Controversies ==
=== Physiology or Medicine ===
Lauterbur and Mansfield's awarding for magnetic resonance imaging development was criticized due to the Nobel Foundation's lack of acknowledgement for Raymond Damadian, a scientist who similarly contributed to the invention of the technology in the seventies alongside Lauterbur and Mansfield.
