= 2015 Nobel Prizes =

The 2015 Nobel Prizes were awarded by the Nobel Foundation, based in Sweden. Six categories were awarded: Physics, Chemistry, Physiology or Medicine, Literature, Peace, and Economic Sciences.

Nobel Week took place from 6 to 12 December, including programming such as lectures, dialogues, and discussions. The award ceremony and banquet for the Peace Prize were scheduled in Oslo on December 10, while the award ceremony and banquet for all other categories were scheduled for the same day in Stockholm.

As of 2 June 2026, the 2015 Nobel Prizes remain the earliest awards where all non-organization laureates are alive.

== Prizes ==
=== Physics ===
Awardee(s)
Takaaki Kajita (b. 1959)	Japanese	"for the discovery of neutrino oscillations, which shows that neutrinos have mass"
Arthur B. McDonald (b. 1943)	Canadian	"for the discovery of neutrino oscillations, which shows that neutrinos have mass"

=== Chemistry ===
Awardee(s)
Tomas Lindahl (b. 1938)	Swedish British	"for mechanistic studies of DNA repair"
Paul L. Modrich (b. 1946)	American	"for mechanistic studies of DNA repair"
Aziz Sancar (b. 1946)	Turkish	"for mechanistic studies of DNA repair"

=== Physiology or Medicine ===
Awardee(s)
William C. Campbell (b. 1930)	Ireland United States	"for their discoveries concerning a novel therapy against infections caused by roundworm parasites"
Satoshi Ōmura (b. 1935)	Japan	"for their discoveries concerning a novel therapy against infections caused by roundworm parasites"
Tu Youyou (b. 1930)	China	"for her discoveries concerning a novel therapy against malaria"

=== Literature ===
Awardee(s)		
Svetlana Alexievich (b. 1948)	Belarus (born in Soviet Ukraine)	"for her polyphonic writings, a monument to suffering and courage in our time"

=== Peace ===
Awardee(s)
Tunisian National Dialogue Quartet (2013–2014)	Tunisia	"for its decisive contribution to the building of a pluralistic democracy in Tunisia in the wake of the Jasmine Revolution of 2011."

=== Economic Sciences ===
Awardee(s)
Angus Deaton (b. 1945)	United Kingdom United States	"for his analysis of consumption, poverty, and welfare"

== Reactions ==
=== Physics ===
While the Physics Prize was not inherently disputed, some scientists discussed whether the Nobel Foundation's written citation for Kajita and McDonald's awarding was correct, leading to a technical debate about the definition of a "neutrino oscillation" and whether their experiments showed such a phenomenon.

=== Physiology or Medicine ===
During the COVID-19 pandemic, the awarding of Ivermectin was sometimes invoked in order to justify the medication's usage as a treatment for the Coronavirus. However, Campbell and Ōmura had been awarded for Ivermectin's effectiveness specifically against parasitic infections.
