= 1997 Nobel Prizes =

The 1997 Nobel Prizes were awarded by the Nobel Foundation, based in Sweden. Six categories were awarded: Physics, Chemistry, Physiology or Medicine, Literature, Peace, and Economic Sciences.

Nobel Week took place from December 6 to 12, including programming such as lectures, dialogues, and discussions. The award ceremony and banquet for the Peace Prize were scheduled in Oslo on December 10, while the award ceremony and banquet for all other categories were scheduled for the same day in Stockholm.

== Prizes ==
=== Physics ===
Awardee(s)
Steven Chu (b. 1948)	American	"for development of methods to cool and trap atoms with laser light."
Claude Cohen-Tannoudji (b. 1933)	French	"for development of methods to cool and trap atoms with laser light."
William Daniel Phillips (b. 1948)	American	"for development of methods to cool and trap atoms with laser light."

=== Chemistry ===
Awardee(s)
Paul D. Boyer (1918–2018)	American	"for their elucidation of the enzymatic mechanism underlying the synthesis of adenosine triphosphate (ATP)"
John E. Walker (b. 1941)	British	"for their elucidation of the enzymatic mechanism underlying the synthesis of adenosine triphosphate (ATP)"
Jens C. Skou (1918–2018)	Danish	"for the first discovery of an ion-transporting enzyme, Na^{+}, K^{+} -ATPase"

=== Physiology or Medicine ===
Awardee(s)
Stanley B. Prusiner (b. 1942)	United States	"for his discovery of Prions - a new biological principle of infection"

=== Literature ===
Awardee(s)		
Dario Fo (1926–2016)	Italy	"who emulates the jesters of the Middle Ages in scourging authority and upholding the dignity of the downtrodden"

=== Peace ===
Awardee(s)
International Campaign to Ban Landmines (founded 1992)	Switzerland	"for their work for the banning and clearing of anti-personnel mines."
Jody Williams (born 1950)	United States	"for their work for the banning and clearing of anti-personnel mines."

=== Economic Sciences ===
Awardee(s)
Robert C. Merton (b. 1944)	United States	"for a new method to determine the value of derivatives"
Myron Scholes (b. 1941)	Canada United States	"for a new method to determine the value of derivatives"

== Controversies ==
=== Physics ===
Some in the Russian scientific community disputed Chu, Cohen-Tannoudji, and Phillips' methodologies and claimed that some scientists in Russia had executed their experiments first.

=== Physiology or Medicine ===
Prusiner's discovery of prions initially faced criticisms and denials, provoking a longstanding debate in the scientific community regarding the existence of prions that wouldn't be resolved, with their full acknowledgement, until years later.

=== Literature ===
Fo's awarding was considered "rather lightweight" by some critics, as he was seen primarily as a performer; he had also been censured by the Roman Catholic Church.
