= 2008 Nobel Prizes =

The 2008 Nobel Prizes were awarded by the Nobel Foundation, based in Sweden. Six categories were awarded: Physics, Chemistry, Physiology or Medicine, Literature, Peace, and Economic Sciences.

Nobel Week took place from December 6 to 12, including programming such as lectures, dialogues, and discussions. The award ceremony and banquet for the Peace Prize were scheduled in Oslo on December 10, while the award ceremony and banquet for all other categories were scheduled for the same day in Stockholm.

== Prizes ==
=== Physics ===
Awardee(s)
Makoto Kobayashi (b. 1944)	Japanese	"for the discovery of the origin of the broken symmetry which predicts the existence of at least three families of quarks in nature"
Toshihide Maskawa (1940–2021)	Japanese	"for the discovery of the origin of the broken symmetry which predicts the existence of at least three families of quarks in nature"
Yoichiro Nambu (1921–2015)	Japanese American	"for the discovery of the mechanism of spontaneous broken symmetry in subatomic physics"

=== Chemistry ===
Awardee(s)
Osamu Shimomura (1928–2018)	Japanese	"for the discovery and development of the green fluorescent protein, GFP"
Martin Chalfie (b. 1947)	American	"for the discovery and development of the green fluorescent protein, GFP"
Roger Y. Tsien (1952–2016)	American	"for the discovery and development of the green fluorescent protein, GFP"

=== Physiology or Medicine ===
Awardee(s)
Harald zur Hausen (1936–2023)	Germany	"for his discovery of human papilloma viruses causing cervical cancer"
Françoise Barré-Sinoussi (b. 1947)	France	"for their discovery of human immunodeficiency virus"
Luc Montagnier (1932–2022)	France	"for their discovery of human immunodeficiency virus"

=== Literature ===
Awardee(s)		
Jean-Marie Gustave Le Clézio (b. 1940)	France Mauritius	"author of new departures, poetic adventure and sensual ecstasy, explorer of a humanity beyond and below the reigning civilization"

=== Peace ===
Awardee(s)
Martti Ahtisaari (1937–2023)	Finland	"for his important efforts, on several continents and over more than three decades, to resolve international conflicts."

=== Economic Sciences ===
Awardee(s)
Paul Krugman (b. 1953)	United States	"for his analysis of trade patterns and location of economic activity"

== Controversies ==
=== Physics ===
Half of the 2008 Physics Prize went to Makoto Kobayashi and Toshihide Maskawa for their 1972 work on quark mixing. This postulated the existence of three additional quarks beyond the three then known to exist and used this postulate to provide a possible mechanism for CP violation, which had been observed 8 years earlier. Their work expanded and reinterpreted research by the Italian physicist Nicola Cabibbo, dating to 1963, before the quark model was even introduced. The resulting quark mixing matrix, which described probabilities of different quarks to turn into each other under the action of the weak force, is known as CKM matrix, after Cabibbo, Kobayashi, and Maskawa. Cabibbo arguably merited a share of the award. The recipient of the other half of the 2008 prize was Yoichiro Nambu for the discovery of the mechanism of spontaneous broken symmetry in subatomic physics. The fundamental step in this field is the Nambu–Jona-Lasinio model (NJL model), developed together with the Italian theoretical physicist Giovanni Jona-Lasinio, who was left out of the prize like Cabibbo. In recognition to his colleague's work, Nambu asked Jona-Lasinio to hold the Nobel Lecture at the Stockholm University in his place. As the prize is awarded each year to at most three people for no more than two different research works, the committee was forced to skip one member each from both the CKM and the NJL workgroups.

=== Chemistry ===
The 2008 Chemistry Prize was awarded to Osamu Shimomura, Martin Chalfie and Roger Y. Tsien for their work on green fluorescent protein (GFP). A fourth potential recipient, Douglas Prasher, was the first to clone the GFP gene and suggest its use as a biological tracer; however, he had left academia and was working as a courtesy shuttle bus driver - a fact which received considerable media coverage. Lack of support for Prasher's work, and failure to get tenure at the Woods Hole Oceanographic Institute in Massachusetts where he was employed, caused Prasher to leave this field of research in 1992, but not before he offered samples of the gene to any interested researchers, including Chalfie and Tsien. Tsien noted the prize is usually awarded for "specific discoveries" and that he had put forward Shimomura and Prasher to the Nobel Committee in 2004. Chalfie stated, "Douglas Prasher's work was critical and essential for the work we did in our lab. They could've easily given the prize to Douglas and the other two and left me out." Roger Tsien had offered Prasher a job when his academic career stalled. Eventually, Prasher accepted the offer and moved in 2013 to UCSD to join Tsien's lab.

=== Physiology or Medicine ===
zur Hausen's award for the Physiology or Medicine Prize was overshadowed by a brief investigation into possible corruptive influences between the Nobel Foundation and AstraZeneca, a pharmaceutical company that had major stake in HPV vaccines. Although it was revealed that two senior officials on the selection committee had ties to AstraZeneca, no formal indictment happened. Many also showed dismay at the lack of acknowledgement for Robert Gallo's contributions to HIV/AIDS research.
