= 2022 Nobel Prizes =

The 2022 Nobel Prizes were awarded by the Nobel Foundation, based in Sweden. Six categories were awarded: Physics, Chemistry, Physiology or Medicine, Literature, Peace, and Economic Sciences. The winners in each category were announced from October 3 to October 10.

Nobel Week took place from December 6 to 12, including programming such as lectures, dialogues, and discussions. The award ceremony and banquet for the Peace Prize were scheduled in Oslo on December 10, while the award ceremony and banquet for all other categories were scheduled for the same day in Stockholm.

== Prizes ==
=== Physics ===
Awardee(s)
Alain Aspect (b. 1947)	French	"for experiments with entangled photons, establishing the violation of Bell inequalities and pioneering quantum information science"
John Clauser (b. 1942)	American	"for experiments with entangled photons, establishing the violation of Bell inequalities and pioneering quantum information science"
Anton Zeilinger (b. 1945)	Austrian	"for experiments with entangled photons, establishing the violation of Bell inequalities and pioneering quantum information science"

=== Chemistry ===
Awardee(s)
Carolyn Bertozzi (b. 1966)	American	"for the development of click chemistry and bioorthogonal chemistry"
Morten Meldal (b. 1954)	Danish	"for the development of click chemistry and bioorthogonal chemistry"
K. Barry Sharpless (b. 1941)	American	"for the development of click chemistry and bioorthogonal chemistry"

=== Physiology or Medicine ===
Awardee(s)
Svante Pääbo (b. 1955)	Sweden	"for his discoveries concerning the genomes of extinct hominins and human evolution"

=== Literature ===
Awardee(s)
Annie Ernaux (b. 1940)	France	"for the courage and clinical acuity with which she uncovers the roots, estrangements and collective restraints of personal memory"

=== Peace ===
Awardee(s)
Ales Bialiatski (b. 1962)	Belarus	"The Peace Prize laureates represent civil society in their home countries. They have for many years promoted the right to criticise power and protect the fundamental rights of citizens. They have made an outstanding effort to document war crimes, human right abuses and the abuse of power. Together they demonstrate the significance of civil society for peace and democracy."
Memorial (founded 1989)	Russia	"The Peace Prize laureates represent civil society in their home countries. They have for many years promoted the right to criticise power and protect the fundamental rights of citizens. They have made an outstanding effort to document war crimes, human right abuses and the abuse of power. Together they demonstrate the significance of civil society for peace and democracy."
Centre for Civil Liberties (founded 2007)	Ukraine	"The Peace Prize laureates represent civil society in their home countries. They have for many years promoted the right to criticise power and protect the fundamental rights of citizens. They have made an outstanding effort to document war crimes, human right abuses and the abuse of power. Together they demonstrate the significance of civil society for peace and democracy."

=== Economic Sciences ===
Awardee(s)
Ben Bernanke (b. 1953)	United States	"for research on banks and financial crises"
Douglas Diamond (b. 1953)	United States	"for research on banks and financial crises"
Philip H. Dybvig (b. 1955)	United States	"for research on banks and financial crises"

== Other events ==
The Nobel Prize Concert took place on December 8 at Stockholm Concert Hall, featuring singer Diana Damrau and conductor Manfred Honeck. The Nobel Banquet menu was set by chef Jimmi Eriksson and pastry chief Annie Hesselstad. Nobel Week Lights Stockholm ran from December 3 to December 11, illuminating Stockholm with light installations from 20 artworks inspired by the prizes.
