= 1999 Nobel Prizes =

The 1999 Nobel Prizes were awarded by the Nobel Foundation, based in Sweden. Six categories were awarded: Physics, Chemistry, Physiology or Medicine, Literature, Peace, and Economic Sciences.

Nobel Week took place from December 6 to 12, including programming such as lectures, dialogues, and discussions. The award ceremony and banquet for the Peace Prize were scheduled in Oslo on December 10, while the award ceremony and banquet for all other categories were scheduled for the same day in Stockholm.

== Prizes ==
=== Physics ===
Awardee(s)
Gerard 't Hooft (b. 1946)	Dutch	"for elucidating the quantum structure of electroweak interactions in physics"
Martinus J. G. Veltman (1931–2021)	Dutch	"for elucidating the quantum structure of electroweak interactions in physics"

=== Chemistry ===
Awardee(s)
Ahmed Zewail (1946–2016)	Egyptian American	"for his studies of the transition states of chemical reactions using femtosecond spectroscopy"

=== Physiology or Medicine ===
Awardee(s)
Günter Blobel (1936–2018)	United States	"for the discovery that proteins have intrinsic signals that govern their transport and localization in the cell"

=== Literature ===
Awardee(s)		
Günter Grass (1927–2015)	Germany (born in Free City of Danzig)	"whose frolicsome black fables portray the forgotten face of history"

=== Peace ===
Awardee(s)
Médecins Sans Frontières	Switzerland	"in recognition of the organization's pioneering humanitarian work on several continents."

=== Economic Sciences ===
Awardee(s)
Robert Mundell (1932–2021)	Canada	"for his analysis of monetary and fiscal policy under different exchange rate regimes and his analysis of optimum currency areas"
