= 2023 Nobel Prizes =

The 2023 Nobel Prizes were awarded by the Nobel Foundation in Sweden. Six categories were awarded: Physics, Chemistry, Physiology or Medicine, Literature, Peace, and Economic Sciences.

Nobel Week took place from December 5 to 12, including programming such as lectures, dialogues, exhibitions, concerts, and seminars, as well as the annual Nobel Week Lights Festival. The award ceremony and banquet for the Peace Prize were scheduled in Oslo on December 10, while the award ceremony and banquet for all other categories were scheduled for the same day in Stockholm.

== Prizes ==
=== The Nobel Prize in Physics ===
Awardee(s)
US_Embassy_Sweden_2023_Nobel_Reception_(53397591873)_(cropped)	Pierre Agostini (b. 1941)	French	"for experimental methods that generate attosecond pulses of light for the study of electron dynamics in matter"
Ferenc Krausz (cropped)	Ferenc Krausz (b. 1962)	Hungarian	"for experimental methods that generate attosecond pulses of light for the study of electron dynamics in matter"
Anne LHuiller 01	Anne L'Huillier (b. 1958)	French Swedish	"for experimental methods that generate attosecond pulses of light for the study of electron dynamics in matter"

=== The Nobel Prize in Chemistry ===
Awardee(s)
US Embassy Sweden 2023 Nobel Reception (53390424864) (cropped)	Moungi G. Bawendi (b. 1962)	American Tunisian French	"for the discovery and synthesis of quantum dots"
Portrait of Louis E Brus	Louis E. Brus (1943–2026)	American	"for the discovery and synthesis of quantum dots"
US Embassy Sweden 2023 Nobel Reception (53390424929) (cropped)	Aleksey Yekimov (b. 1945)	Russian	"for the discovery and synthesis of quantum dots"

=== The Nobel Prize in Physiology or Medicine ===
Awardee(s)
Katalin Karikó by Christopher Michel in 2024	Katalin Karikó (b. 1955)	Hungary	"for their discoveries concerning nucleoside base modifications that enabled the development of effective mRNA vaccines against COVID-19"
Drew Weissman Life Science medalist (cropped)	Drew Weissman (b. 1959)	United States	"for their discoveries concerning nucleoside base modifications that enabled the development of effective mRNA vaccines against COVID-19"

=== The Nobel Prize in Literature ===
Awardee(s)
Writer Jon Fosse (cropped)	Jon Fosse (b. 1959)	Norway	"his innovative plays and prose which give voice to the unsayable"

=== The Nobel Peace Prize ===
Awardee(s)
Narges Mohammadi (cropped)	Narges Mohammadi (b. 1972)	Iran	"for her fight against the oppression of women in Iran and her fight to promote human rights and freedom for all"

=== The Nobel Prize in Economic Sciences ===
Awardee(s)
Claudia Goldin (3x4 cropped)	Claudia Goldin (b. 1946)	United States	"for having advanced our understanding of women’s labour market outcomes"
