= 2013 Nobel Prizes =

The 2013 Nobel Prizes were awarded by the Nobel Foundation, based in Sweden. Six categories were awarded: Physics, Chemistry, Physiology or Medicine, Literature, Peace, and Economic Sciences.

Nobel Week took place from December 6 to 12, including programming such as lectures, dialogues, and discussions. The award ceremony and banquet for the Peace Prize were scheduled in Oslo on December 10, while the award ceremony and banquet for all other categories were scheduled for the same day in Stockholm.

== Prizes ==
=== Physics ===
Awardee(s)
François Englert (1932–2026)	Belgian	"for the theoretical discovery of a mechanism that contributes to our understanding of the origin of mass of subatomic particles, and which recently was confirmed through the discovery of the predicted fundamental particle, by the ATLAS and CMS experiments at CERN's Large Hadron Collider"
Peter Higgs (1929–2024)	British	"for the theoretical discovery of a mechanism that contributes to our understanding of the origin of mass of subatomic particles, and which recently was confirmed through the discovery of the predicted fundamental particle, by the ATLAS and CMS experiments at CERN's Large Hadron Collider"

=== Chemistry ===
Awardee(s)
Martin Karplus (1930–2024)	Austrian American	"for the development of multiscale models for complex chemical systems"
Michael Levitt (b. 1947)	South African American British Israeli	"for the development of multiscale models for complex chemical systems"
Arieh Warshel (b. 1940)	Israeli American	"for the development of multiscale models for complex chemical systems"

=== Physiology or Medicine ===
Awardee(s)
James E. Rothman (b. 1950)	United States	"for their discoveries of machinery regulating vesicle traffic, a major transport system in our cells"
Randy W. Schekman (b. 1948)	United States	"for their discoveries of machinery regulating vesicle traffic, a major transport system in our cells"
Thomas C. Südhof (b. 1955)	Germany United States	"for their discoveries of machinery regulating vesicle traffic, a major transport system in our cells"

=== Literature ===
Awardee(s)		
Alice Munro (1931–2024)	Canada	"master of the contemporary short story"

=== Peace ===
Awardee(s)
Organisation for the Prohibition of Chemical Weapons (founded 1997)	The Netherlands	"for its extensive efforts to eliminate chemical weapons."

=== Economic Sciences ===
Awardee(s)
Eugene F. Fama (b. 1939)	United States	"for their empirical analysis of asset prices"
Lars Peter Hansen (b. 1952)	United States	"for their empirical analysis of asset prices"
Robert J. Shiller (b. 1946)	United States	"for their empirical analysis of asset prices"
