= 2011 Nobel Prizes =

The 2011 Nobel Prizes were awarded by the Nobel Foundation, based in Sweden. Six categories were awarded: Physics, Chemistry, Physiology or Medicine, Literature, Peace, and Economic Sciences.

Nobel Week took place from December 6 to 12, including programming such as lectures, dialogues, and discussions. The award ceremony and banquet for the Peace Prize were scheduled in Oslo on December 10, while the award ceremony and banquet for all other categories were scheduled for the same day in Stockholm.

== Prizes ==
=== Physics ===
Awardee(s)
Saul Perlmutter (b. 1959)	American	"for the discovery of the accelerating expansion of the Universe through observations of distant supernovae"
Brian P. Schmidt (b. 1967)	Australian	"for the discovery of the accelerating expansion of the Universe through observations of distant supernovae"
Adam G. Riess (b. 1969)	American	"for the discovery of the accelerating expansion of the Universe through observations of distant supernovae"

=== Chemistry ===
Awardee(s)
Dan Shechtman (b. 1941)	Israeli American	"for the discovery of quasicrystals"

=== Physiology or Medicine ===
Awardee(s)
Bruce A. Beutler (b. 1957)	United States	"for their discoveries concerning the activation of innate immunity"
Jules A. Hoffmann (b. 1941)	France	"for their discoveries concerning the activation of innate immunity"
Ralph M. Steinman (1943–2011)	Canada	"for his discovery of the dendritic cell and its role in adaptive immunity" (awarded posthumously)

=== Literature ===
Awardee(s)		
Tomas Tranströmer (1931–2015)	Sweden	"because, through his condensed, translucent images, he gives us fresh access to reality"

=== Peace ===
Awardee(s)
Ellen Johnson Sirleaf (born 1938)	Liberia	"for their non-violent struggle for the safety of women and for women's rights to full participation in peace-building work."
Leymah Gbowee (born 1972)	Liberia	"for their non-violent struggle for the safety of women and for women's rights to full participation in peace-building work."
Tawakkul Karman (born 1979)	Yemen	"for their non-violent struggle for the safety of women and for women's rights to full participation in peace-building work."

=== Economic Sciences ===
Awardee(s)
Thomas J. Sargent (b. 1943)	United States	"for their empirical research on cause and effect in the macroeconomy"
Christopher A. Sims (1942–2026)	United States	"for their empirical research on cause and effect in the macroeconomy"

== Controversies ==
=== Physiology or Medicine ===
Steinman died from cancer shortly before the awards ceremony, creating a technical complication for the Nobel Foundation regarding its policy of prohibiting posthumous awards. Ultimately, the committee ruled that Steinman's naming as a recipient prior to his death resolved the posthumous question.

Over 20 immunologists, in an open letter published in Nature, applauded the foundation's recognition of "the field of innate immunity" but lamented the lack of acknowledgement for scientists Charles Janeway and Ruslan Medzhitov whose discoveries constituted a "Nobel-standard breakthrough" in regards to said field.

Hoffman's awarding was questioned by Bruce Lemaitre, a scientist who worked in Hoffman's lab in the nineties during the course of Hoffman's immunology research. On a website launched after the award's announcement, Lemaitre claimed that he himself did much of the work on immunity while Hoffman was originally uninterested in his project and later "inappropriately" took credit for it as a group effort.

=== Peace ===
Many questioned Sirleaf's awarding of the Peace Prize, pointing to her record as a head of state involving violent and corrupt leadership, as well as her past affiliation to Charles Taylor prior to her tenure as president. Fellow laureate, Gbowee, also criticized Sirleaf's administration on similar lines. However, others pushed back against said criticisms, stating that her advocacy of women's rights in Liberia has still been groundbreaking and influential.
