= 2020 Nobel Prizes =

The 2020 Nobel Prizes were awarded by the Nobel Foundation, based in Sweden. Six categories were awarded: Physics, Chemistry, Physiology or Medicine, Literature, Peace, and Economic Sciences.

Due to the COVID-19 pandemic, programming for Nobel Week was limited, with some ceremonies and events taking place virtually.

== Prizes ==
=== Physics ===
Awardee(s)
Roger Penrose (b. 1931)	British	"for the discovery that black hole formation is a robust prediction of the general theory of relativity"
Reinhard Genzel (b. 1952)	German	"for the discovery of a supermassive compact object at the centre of our galaxy"
Andrea M. Ghez (b. 1965)	American	"for the discovery of a supermassive compact object at the centre of our galaxy"

=== Chemistry ===
Awardee(s)
Emmanuelle Charpentier (b. 1968)	French	"for the development of a method for genome editing"
Jennifer Doudna (b. 1964)	American	"for the development of a method for genome editing"

=== Physiology or Medicine ===
Awardee(s)
Harvey J. Alter (b. 1935)	United States	"for the discovery of Hepatitis C virus"
Michael Houghton (b. 1949)	United Kingdom	"for the discovery of Hepatitis C virus"
Charles M. Rice (b. 1952)	United States	"for the discovery of Hepatitis C virus"

=== Literature ===
Awardee(s)		
Louise Glück (1943–2023)	United States	"for her unmistakable poetic voice that with austere beauty makes individual existence universal"

=== Peace ===
Awardee(s)
World Food Programme (founded 1961)	United Nations	"for its efforts to combat hunger, for its contribution to bettering conditions for peace in conflict-affected areas and for acting as a driving force in efforts to prevent the use of hunger as a weapon of war and conflict."

=== Economic Sciences ===
Awardee(s)
Paul Milgrom (b. 1948)	United States	"for improvements to auction theory and inventions of new auction formats"
Robert B. Wilson (b. 1937)	United States	"for improvements to auction theory and inventions of new auction formats"

== Controversies ==
=== Chemistry ===
The Chemistry Prize's awarding to Charpentier and Doudna provoked debates about who "discovered" CRISPR, with some arguing that scientists like Feng Zhang or Virginijus Šikšnys should have been properly credited.

== Changes ==
Each prize's awarding amount increased from 9 million Swedish krona to 10 million.
