= 2000 Nobel Prizes =

The 2000 Nobel Prizes were awarded by the Nobel Foundation, based in Sweden. Six categories were awarded: Physics, Chemistry, Physiology or Medicine, Literature, Peace, and Economic Sciences.

Nobel Week took place from December 6 to 12, including programming such as lectures, dialogues, and discussions. The award ceremony and banquet for the Peace Prize were scheduled in Oslo on December 10, while the award ceremony and banquet for all other categories were scheduled for the same day in Stockholm.

== Prizes ==
=== Physics ===
Awardee(s)
Zhores Alferov (1930–2019)	Russian	"for developing semiconductor heterostructures used in high-speed- and optoelectronics"
Herbert Kroemer (1928–2024)	German	"for developing semiconductor heterostructures used in high-speed- and optoelectronics"
Jack Kilby (1923–2005)	American	"for his part in the invention of the integrated circuit"

=== Chemistry ===
Awardee(s)
Alan J. Heeger (b. 1936)	American	"for their discovery and development of conductive polymers"
Alan G. MacDiarmid (1927–2007)	New Zealander American	"for their discovery and development of conductive polymers"
Hideki Shirakawa (b. 1936)	Japanese	"for their discovery and development of conductive polymers"

=== Physiology or Medicine ===
Awardee(s)
Arvid Carlsson (1923–2018)	Sweden	"for their discoveries concerning signal transduction in the nervous system"
Paul Greengard (1925–2019)	United States	"for their discoveries concerning signal transduction in the nervous system"
Eric Kandel (b. 1929)	Austria United States	"for their discoveries concerning signal transduction in the nervous system"

=== Literature ===
Awardee(s)		
Gao Xingjian (b. 1940)	France (Taiwan) China	"for an oeuvre of universal validity, bitter insights and linguistic ingenuity, which has opened new paths for the Chinese novel and drama"

=== Peace ===
Awardee(s)
Kim Dae-jung (1924–2009)	South Korea	"for his work for democracy and human rights in South Korea and in East Asia in general, and for peace and reconciliation with North Korea in particular."

=== Economic Sciences ===
Awardee(s)
James Heckman (b. 1944)	United States	"for his development of theory and methods for analyzing selective samples"
Daniel McFadden (b. 1937)	United States	"for his development of theory and methods for analyzing discrete choice"

== Controversies ==
=== Literature ===
Gao's awarding was met with silence in China followed by condemnation in the Chinese media.
