= Martin M. Kaplan =

American virologist and public health official (1915–2004)

- Born: 23 June 1915; Philadelphia, Pennsylvania, United States
- Died: 16 October 2004 (aged 89); Collonge-Bellerive, Switzerland
- Education: Temple University; University of Pennsylvania
- Known for: Veterinary public health; rabies research; leadership in Pugwash Conferences
- Spouse: Lenna Bouchal
- Children: 3
- Scientific career
- Fields: Virology, Public health
- Workplaces: World Health Organization

Martin M. Kaplan (23 June 1915 – 16 October 2004) was an American virologist, veterinary scientist and public health official.

== Early life ==
Kaplan was born in Philadelphia to Russian immigrant parents and was the youngest of eight children. He developed an early interest in music and played the cello throughout his life. Kaplan earned his undergraduate degree from Temple University and obtained a doctor of veterinary medicine in 1940 and a master's degree in public health in 1942 from the University of Pennsylvania. He taught at Middlesex University (later Brandeis University) from 1942 to 1944.

== Career ==
During the Second World War, Kaplan joined the United Nations Relief and Rehabilitation Administration (UNRRA). In 1945 he travelled to Greece with prize cattle to help restore local livestock, later working in Cyprus and Lebanon. In 1949 Kaplan joined the World Health Organization (WHO) and set up the Veterinary Public Health Unit. He later became director of science and technology, and then head of Research and Development.

Kaplan focussed on rabies, influenza and tropical diseases. He was a leading figure in research on rabies vaccines and collaborated with scientists at the Wistar Institute in Philadelphia and the University of Wisconsin. In the 1960s and 1970s Kaplan participated in developing safer rabies vaccines for humans and animals. He was known for personally testing early versions of vaccines on himself.

== Pugwash movement ==
From the late 1950s, Kaplan became involved in the Pugwash Conferences, which brought together scientists from both sides of the Cold War. As secretary-general from 1976 to 1988, he organised dozens of workshops and study groups addressing nuclear, chemical and biological disarmament. Pugwash, and its founder Joseph Rotblat, received the Nobel Peace Prize in 1995.

== Later life and death ==
Kaplan settled in Collonge-Bellerive, near Geneva in the early fifties. This was for a great part due to political pressures in the U.S. during the McCarthy era. Some of his friends fell victim to it. He remained active in music and in international disarmament discussions. Kaplan died of cancer in Geneva on 16 October 2004 at the age of 89. He was survived by his wife Lenna, their daughter and two sons.

== See also ==
- 1995 Nobel Prizes
