= 1993 Nobel Prizes =

The 1993 Nobel Prizes were awarded by the Nobel Foundation, based in Sweden. Six categories were awarded: Physics, Chemistry, Physiology or Medicine, Literature, Peace, and Economic Sciences.

== Prizes ==
=== Physics ===
Awardee(s)
Russell Alan Hulse (b. 1950)	American	"for the discovery of a new type of pulsar, a discovery that has opened up new possibilities for the study of gravitation"
Joseph Hooton Taylor Jr. (b. 1941)	American	"for the discovery of a new type of pulsar, a discovery that has opened up new possibilities for the study of gravitation"

=== Chemistry ===
Awardee(s)
Kary B. Mullis (1944–2019)	American	"for contributions to the developments of methods within DNA-based chemistry [...] for his invention of the polymerase chain reaction (PCR) method"
Michael Smith (1932–2000)	British Canadian	"for contributions to the developments of methods within DNA-based chemistry [...] for his fundamental contributions to the establishment of oligonucleotide-based, site-directed mutagenesis and its development for protein studies"

=== Physiology or Medicine ===
Awardee(s)
Sir Richard J. Roberts (b. 1943)	United Kingdom	"for their discoveries of split genes"
Phillip A. Sharp (b. 1944)	United States	"for their discoveries of split genes"

=== Literature ===
Awardee(s)		
Toni Morrison (1931–2019)	United States	"who in novels characterized by visionary force and poetic import, gives life to an essential aspect of American reality"

=== Peace ===
Awardee(s)
Nelson Mandela (1918–2013)	South Africa	"for their work for the peaceful termination of the apartheid regime, and for laying the foundations for a new democratic South Africa."
Frederik Willem de Klerk (1936–2021)	South Africa	"for their work for the peaceful termination of the apartheid regime, and for laying the foundations for a new democratic South Africa."

=== Economic Sciences ===
Awardee(s)
Robert Fogel (1926–2013)	United States	"for having renewed research in economic history by applying economic theory and quantitative methods in order to explain economic and institutional change"
Douglass North (1920–2015)	United States	"for having renewed research in economic history by applying economic theory and quantitative methods in order to explain economic and institutional change"

== Controversies ==
=== Physiology or Medicine ===
Scientists argued that Louise T. Chow, a China-born Taiwanese researcher, should have been acknowledged alongside Roberts, as she not only collaborated with him but also pioneered the experiments that led to the discovery of split genes. Others also mentioned the exclusion of credit for Susan Berget, a then-postdoctoral fellow who helped with Sharp's discovery.
