= 2018 Nobel Prizes =

The 2018 Nobel Prizes were awarded by the Nobel Foundation, based in Sweden. Six categories were awarded: Physics, Chemistry, Physiology or Medicine, Literature, Peace, and Economic Sciences.

Nobel Week took place from December 6 to 12, including programming such as lectures, dialogues, and discussions. The award ceremony and banquet for the Peace Prize were scheduled in Oslo on December 10, while the award ceremony and banquet for all other categories were scheduled for the same day in Stockholm.

== Prizes ==
=== Physics ===
Awardee(s)
| Arthur Ashkin (1922–2020) | American | "for groundbreaking inventions in the field of laser physics", in particular "for the optical tweezers and their application to biological systems" |
| Gérard Mourou (b. 1944) | French | "for groundbreaking inventions in the field of laser physics", in particular "for their method of generating high-intensity, ultra-short optical pulses" |
| Donna Strickland (b. 1959) | Canadian | "for groundbreaking inventions in the field of laser physics", in particular "for their method of generating high-intensity, ultra-short optical pulses" |

=== Chemistry ===
Awardee(s)
| Frances Arnold (b. 1956) | American | "for the directed evolution of enzymes" |
| George Smith (b. 1941) | American | "for the phage display of peptides and antibodies" |
| Sir Gregory Winter (b. 1951) | British | "for the phage display of peptides and antibodies" |

=== Physiology or Medicine ===
Awardee(s)
| James P. Allison (b. 1948) | United States | "for their discovery of cancer therapy by inhibition of negative immune regulation" |
| Tasuku Honjo (b. 1942) | Japan | "for their discovery of cancer therapy by inhibition of negative immune regulation" |

=== Literature ===
| Awardee(s) | | |
|---|---|---|
| Olga Tokarczuk (b. 1962) | Poland | "for a narrative imagination that with encyclopedic passion represents the crossing of boundaries as a form of life" |

=== Peace ===
Awardee(s)
| Denis Mukwege (b. 1955) | Democratic Republic of the Congo | "for their efforts to end the use of sexual violence as a weapon of war and armed conflict." |
| Nadia Murad (b. 1993) | Iraq | "for their efforts to end the use of sexual violence as a weapon of war and armed conflict." |

=== Economic Sciences ===
Awardee(s)
| William Nordhaus (b. 1941) | United States | "for integrating climate change into long-run macroeconomic analysis" |
| Paul Romer (b. 1955) | United States | "for integrating technological innovations into long-run macroeconomic analysis" |
