= 2010 Nobel Prizes =

The 2010 Nobel Prizes were awarded by the Nobel Foundation, based in Sweden. Six categories were awarded: Physics, Chemistry, Physiology or Medicine, Literature, Peace, and Economic Sciences.

Nobel Week took place from December 6 to 12, including programming such as lectures, dialogues, and discussions. The award ceremony and banquet for the Peace Prize were scheduled in Oslo on December 10, while the award ceremony and banquet for all other categories were scheduled for the same day in Stockholm.

== Prizes ==
=== Physics ===
Awardee(s)
Andre Geim (b. 1958)	Russian British	"for groundbreaking experiments regarding the two-dimensional material graphene"
Konstantin Novoselov (b. 1974)	Russian British	"for groundbreaking experiments regarding the two-dimensional material graphene"

=== Chemistry ===
Awardee(s)
Richard F. Heck (1931–2015)	American	"for palladium-catalyzed cross couplings in organic synthesis"
Ei-ichi Negishi (1935–2021)	Japanese	"for palladium-catalyzed cross couplings in organic synthesis"
Akira Suzuki (b. 1930)	Japanese	"for palladium-catalyzed cross couplings in organic synthesis"

=== Physiology or Medicine ===
Awardee(s)
Sir Robert G. Edwards (1925–2013)	United Kingdom	"for the development of in vitro fertilization"

=== Literature ===
Awardee(s)		
Mario Vargas Llosa (1936–2025)	Peru Spain	"for his cartography of structures of power and his trenchant images of the individual's resistance, revolt, and defeat"

=== Peace ===
Awardee(s)
Liu Xiaobo^{[A]} (1955–2017)	China	"for his long and non-violent struggle for fundamental human rights in China."

=== Economic Sciences ===
Awardee(s)
Peter A. Diamond (b. 1940)	United States	"for their analysis of markets with search frictions"
Dale T. Mortensen (1939–2014)	United States	"for their analysis of markets with search frictions"
Christopher A. Pissarides (b. 1948)	Cyprus United Kingdom	"for their analysis of markets with search frictions"

^{A} Liu Xiaobo's Prize was awarded in absentia because he was imprisoned in China.

== Controversies ==
=== Physics ===
The 2010 Nobel Prize in Physics was awarded to Andre Geim and Konstantin Novoselov of the University of Manchester "for groundbreaking experiments regarding the two-dimensional material graphene". Several problems with the factual accuracy of the supporting documents issued by the Nobel committee have been pointed out, including that they seem to wrongly attribute the discovery of graphene to Geim and Novoselov, and they did not take into account other contributions to graphene research, like those from Walter de Heer and Philip Kim.

=== Peace ===
Led by pressure from China, several countries boycotted the awards ceremony in Norway due to the Peace Prize's awarding to Liu. China also announced the inauguration of their own peace prize, the Confucius Peace Prize, to be awarded the day before the Nobel Prizes award ceremony.
