= 1996 Nobel Prizes =

The 1996 Nobel Prizes were awarded by the Nobel Foundation, based in Sweden. Six categories were awarded: Physics, Chemistry, Physiology or Medicine, Literature, Peace, and Economic Sciences.

Nobel Week took place from December 6 to 12, including programming such as lectures, dialogues, and discussions. The award ceremony and banquet for the Peace Prize were scheduled in Oslo on December 10, while the award ceremony and banquet for all other categories were scheduled for the same day in Stockholm.

== Prizes ==
=== Physics ===
Awardee(s)
David Lee (b. 1931)	American	"for their discovery of superfluidity in helium-3"
Douglas D. Osheroff (b. 1945)	American	"for their discovery of superfluidity in helium-3"
Robert Coleman Richardson (1937–2013)	American	"for their discovery of superfluidity in helium-3"

=== Chemistry ===
Awardee(s)
Robert F. Curl Jr. (1933–2022)	American	"for their discovery of fullerenes"
Sir Harold W. Kroto (1939–2016)	British	"for their discovery of fullerenes"
Richard E. Smalley (1943–2005)	American	"for their discovery of fullerenes"

=== Physiology or Medicine ===
Awardee(s)
Peter C. Doherty (b. 1940)	Australia	"for their discoveries concerning the specificity of the cell mediated immune defence"
Rolf M. Zinkernagel (b. 1944)	Switzerland	"for their discoveries concerning the specificity of the cell mediated immune defence"

=== Literature ===
Awardee(s)		
Wisława Szymborska (1923–2012)	Poland	"for poetry that with ironic precision allows the historical and biological context to come to light in fragments of human reality"

=== Peace ===
Awardee(s)
Carlos Filipe Ximenes Belo (born 1948)	East Timor	"for their work towards a just and peaceful solution to the conflict in East Timor."
José Ramos-Horta (born 1949)	East Timor	"for their work towards a just and peaceful solution to the conflict in East Timor."

=== Economic Sciences ===
Awardee(s)
James Mirrlees (1936–2018)	United Kingdom	"for their fundamental contributions to the economic theory of incentives under asymmetric information"
William Vickrey (1914–1996)	Canada United States	"for their fundamental contributions to the economic theory of incentives under asymmetric information"
