= 2001 Nobel Prizes =

The 2001 Nobel Prizes were awarded by the Nobel Foundation, based in Sweden. Six categories were awarded: Physics, Chemistry, Physiology or Medicine, Literature, Peace, and Economic Sciences.

Nobel Week took place from December 6 to 12, including programming such as lectures, dialogues, and discussions. The award ceremony and banquet for the Peace Prize were scheduled in Oslo on December 10, while the award ceremony and banquet for all other categories were scheduled for the same day in Stockholm.

== Prizes ==
=== Physics ===
Awardee(s)
Eric Allin Cornell (b. 1961)	American	"for the achievement of Bose–Einstein condensation in dilute gases of alkali atoms, and for early fundamental studies of the properties of the condensates"
Carl Wieman (b. 1951)	American	"for the achievement of Bose–Einstein condensation in dilute gases of alkali atoms, and for early fundamental studies of the properties of the condensates"
Wolfgang Ketterle (b. 1957)	German	"for the achievement of Bose–Einstein condensation in dilute gases of alkali atoms, and for early fundamental studies of the properties of the condensates"

=== Chemistry ===
Awardee(s)
	William S. Knowles (1917–2012)	American	"for their work on chirally catalysed hydrogenation reactions"
Ryōji Noyori	Ryōji Noyori (b. 1938)	Japanese	"for their work on chirally catalysed hydrogenation reactions"
Barry Sharpless	K. Barry Sharpless (b. 1941)	American	"for his work on chirally catalysed oxidation reactions"

=== Physiology or Medicine ===
Awardee(s)
Leland H. Hartwell (b. 1939)	United States	"for their discoveries of key regulators of the cell cycle"
Sir Tim Hunt (b. 1943)	United Kingdom	"for their discoveries of key regulators of the cell cycle"
Sir Paul M. Nurse (b. 1949)	United Kingdom	"for their discoveries of key regulators of the cell cycle"

=== Literature ===
Awardee(s)		
Vidiadhar Surajprasad Naipaul (1932–2018)	United Kingdom Trinidad and Tobago	"for having united perceptive narrative and incorruptible scrutiny in works that compel us to see the presence of suppressed histories"

=== Peace ===
Awardee(s)
United Nations	United Nations	"for their work for a better organized and more peaceful world."
Kofi Annan (1938–2018)	Ghana	"for their work for a better organized and more peaceful world."

=== Economic Sciences ===
Awardee(s)
George Akerlof (b. 1940)	United States	"for their analyses of markets with information asymmetry"
Michael Spence (b. 1943)	United States	"for their analyses of markets with information asymmetry"
Joseph Stiglitz (b. 1943)	United States	"for their analyses of markets with information asymmetry"
