= 2006 Nobel Prizes =

The 2006 Nobel Prizes were awarded by the Nobel Foundation, based in Sweden. Six categories were awarded: Physics, Chemistry, Physiology or Medicine, Literature, Peace, and Economic Sciences.

Nobel Week took place from December 6 to 12, including programming such as lectures, dialogues, and discussions. The award ceremony and banquet for the Peace Prize were scheduled in Oslo on December 10, while the award ceremony and banquet for all other categories were scheduled for the same day in Stockholm.

== Prizes ==
=== Physics ===
Awardee(s)
John C. Mather (b. 1946)	American	"for their discovery of the blackbody form and anisotropy of the cosmic microwave background radiation"
George Smoot (b. 1945)	American	"for their discovery of the blackbody form and anisotropy of the cosmic microwave background radiation"

=== Chemistry ===
Awardee(s)
Roger D. Kornberg (b. 1947)	American	"for his studies of the molecular basis of eukaryotic transcription"

=== Physiology or Medicine ===
Awardee(s)
Andrew Z. Fire (b. 1959)	United States	"for their discovery of RNA interference - gene silencing by double-stranded RNA"
Craig C. Mello (b. 1960)	United States	"for their discovery of RNA interference - gene silencing by double-stranded RNA"

=== Literature ===
Awardee(s)		
Orhan Pamuk (b. 1952)	Turkey	"who in the quest for the melancholic soul of his native city has discovered new symbols for the clash and interlacing of cultures"

=== Peace ===
Awardee(s)
Muhammad Yunus (b. 1940)	Bangladesh	"for their efforts to create economic and social development from below."
Grameen Bank (founded by Muhammad Yunus in 1983)	Bangladesh	"for their efforts to create economic and social development from below."

=== Economic Sciences ===
Awardee(s)
Edmund S. Phelps (1933–2026)	United States	"for his analysis of intertemporal tradeoffs in macroeconomic policy"

== Controversies ==
=== Physiology or Medicine ===
Some scientists observed that Fire and Mello's discoveries in RNA interference in Caenorhabditis elegans had similarly been previously studied by plant biologists like David Baulcombe and that more acknowledgement should've been given.
