= 1994 Nobel Prizes =

The 1994 Nobel Prizes were awarded by the Nobel Foundation, based in Sweden. Six categories were awarded: Physics, Chemistry, Physiology or Medicine, Literature, Peace, and Economic Sciences.

Nobel Week took place from December 6 to 12, including programming such as lectures, dialogues, and discussions. The award ceremony and banquet for the Peace Prize were scheduled in Oslo on December 10, while the award ceremony and banquet for all other categories were scheduled for the same day in Stockholm.

== Prizes ==
=== Physics ===
Awardee(s)
Bertram Brockhouse (1918–2003)	Canadian	"for the development of neutron spectroscopy" and "for pioneering contributions to the development of neutron scattering techniques for studies of condensed matter"
Clifford Shull (1915–2001)	American	"for the development of the neutron diffraction technique" and "for pioneering contributions to the development of neutron scattering techniques for studies of condensed matter"

=== Chemistry ===
Awardee(s)
George A. Olah (1927–2017)	Hungarian American	"for his contribution to carbocation chemistry"

=== Physiology or Medicine ===
Awardee(s)
Alfred G. Gilman (1941–2015)	United States	"for their discovery of G-proteins and the role of these proteins in signal transduction in cells"
Martin Rodbell (1925–1998)	United States	"for their discovery of G-proteins and the role of these proteins in signal transduction in cells"

=== Literature ===
Awardee(s)		
Kenzaburō Ōe (1935–2023)	Japan	"who with poetic force creates an imagined world, where life and myth condense to form a disconcerting picture of the human predicament today"

=== Peace ===
Awardee(s)
Yasser Arafat (1929–2004)	Palestine	"for their efforts to create peace in the Middle East."
Yitzhak Rabin (1922–1995)	Israel	"for their efforts to create peace in the Middle East."
Shimon Peres (1923–2016)	Israel	"for their efforts to create peace in the Middle East."

=== Economic Sciences ===
Awardee(s)
John Harsanyi (1920–2000)	Hungary United States	"for their pioneering analysis of equilibria in the theory of non-cooperative games"
John Forbes Nash (1928–2015)	United States	"for their pioneering analysis of equilibria in the theory of non-cooperative games"
Reinhard Selten (1930–2016)	Germany	"for their pioneering analysis of equilibria in the theory of non-cooperative games"

== Controversies ==
=== Economic Sciences ===
The selection committee was divided on Nash's awarding, with some scrutinizing his mental illness and alleged anti-Semitism. As a result, the governing committee was amended with several changes: members served three-year instead of unlimited terms, and the prize's scope expanded to include political science, psychology, and sociology.

=== Peace ===
Arafat's awarding was criticized by many who scrutinized his actions as part of the Palestine Liberation Organization. In particular, Kåre Kristiansen, a member of the Nobel Committee, resigned in protest, calling him the "world's most prominent terrorist". On the other hand, Edward Said directed criticism toward Peres, Rabin, and the Oslo Accords.
