= 1992 Nobel Prizes =

The 1992 Nobel Prizes were awarded by the Nobel Foundation, based in Sweden. Six categories were awarded: Physics, Chemistry, Physiology or Medicine, Literature, Peace, and Economic Sciences.

== Prizes ==
=== Physics ===
Awardee(s)
Georges Charpak (1924–2010)	French	"for his invention and development of particle detectors, in particular the multiwire proportional chamber"

=== Chemistry ===
Awardee(s)
Rudolph A. Marcus (1923–2026)	Canadian American	"for his contributions to the theory of electron transfer reactions in chemical systems"

=== Physiology or Medicine ===
Awardee(s)
Edmond H. Fischer (1920–2021)	Switzerland United States	"for their discoveries concerning reversible protein phosphorylation as a biological regulatory mechanism"
Edwin G. Krebs (1918–2009)	United States	"for their discoveries concerning reversible protein phosphorylation as a biological regulatory mechanism"

=== Literature ===
Awardee(s)		
Derek Walcott (1930–2017)	Saint Lucia	"for a poetic oeuvre of great luminosity, sustained by a historical vision, the outcome of a multicultural commitment"

=== Peace ===
Awardee(s)
Rigoberta Menchú (born 1959)	Guatemala	"for her struggle for social justice and ethno-cultural reconciliation based on respect for the rights of indigenous peoples."

=== Economic Sciences ===
Awardee(s)
Gary Becker (1930–2014)	United States	"for having extended the domain of microeconomic analysis to a wide range of human behaviour and interaction, including non-market behaviour"
