= Michael Nobel Energy Award =

Proposed prize

The Michael Nobel Energy Award is a proposed prize announced in 2007 by some members of the Nobel family and the Nobel Charitable Trust (founded by Michael Nobel, Peter Nobel, Gustaf Nobel and Philip Nobel). It would award innovations in alternative energy technology. It has not yet been awarded. The prize would be awarded by the Nobel Charitable Trust and not by the Nobel Foundation, the organization that awards the Nobel Prizes.

The plan was to be announced at nanoTX 07. The Nobel Foundation quickly reacted by threatening legal action for "clear misuse of the reputation and goodwill of the Nobel Prize and the associations of integrity and eminence that has been created over time and through the efforts of the Nobel Committees".

The prize is now officially titled The Sustainability Award, presented by the Nobel Sustainability Trust (NST) in academic cooperation with the Technical University of Munich (TUM).

The most recent summit and award ceremony were held in Miami, USA in 2025. Doha, Qatar will host the 2026 ceremony.

== 2025 award winners ==
The 2025 awards were announced in late October 2025, with the ceremony held in Miami in December 2025.

- Manfred Curbach (TU Dresden, Germany): Awarded for Leadership in the Implementation of Sustainability.
- Paul D. N. Hebert (University of Guelph, Canada): Awarded for Outstanding Research and Development in the Field of Biodiversity.
- The Global Observatory of Healthy and Sustainable Cities (GOHSC): Awarded for Outstanding Research and Development for Intelligent and Sustainable Urban Solutions.
