= 2007 Nobel Prizes =

The 2007 Nobel Prizes were awarded by the Nobel Foundation, based in Sweden. Six categories were awarded: Physics, Chemistry, Physiology or Medicine, Literature, Peace, and Economic Sciences.

Nobel Week took place from December 6 to 12, including programming such as lectures, dialogues, and discussions. The award ceremony and banquet for the Peace Prize were scheduled in Oslo on December 10, while the award ceremony and banquet for all other categories were scheduled for the same day in Stockholm.

== Prizes ==
=== Physics ===
Awardee(s)
Albert Fert (b. 1938)	French	"for the discovery of giant magnetoresistance"
Peter Grünberg (1939–2018)	German	"for the discovery of giant magnetoresistance"

=== Chemistry ===
Awardee(s)
Gerhard Ertl (b. 1936)	German	"for his studies of chemical processes on solid surfaces"

=== Physiology or Medicine ===
Awardee(s)
Mario R. Capecchi (b. 1937)	Italy United States	"for their discoveries of principles for introducing specific gene modifications in mice by the use of embryonic stem cells."
Sir Martin Evans (b. 1941)	United Kingdom	"for their discoveries of principles for introducing specific gene modifications in mice by the use of embryonic stem cells."
Oliver Smithies (1925–2017)	United Kingdom United States	"for their discoveries of principles for introducing specific gene modifications in mice by the use of embryonic stem cells."

=== Literature ===
Awardee(s)		
Doris Lessing (1919–2013)	United Kingdom (born in Iran)	"that epicist of the female experience, who with scepticism, fire and visionary power has subjected a divided civilisation to scrutiny"

=== Peace ===
Awardee(s)
Intergovernmental Panel on Climate Change (founded 1988)	United Nations	"for their efforts to build up and disseminate greater knowledge about man-made climate change, and to lay the foundations for the measures that are needed to counteract such change."
Al Gore (born 1948)	United States	"for their efforts to build up and disseminate greater knowledge about man-made climate change, and to lay the foundations for the measures that are needed to counteract such change."

=== Economic Sciences ===
Awardee(s)
Leonid Hurwicz (1917–2008)	Poland United States	"for having laid the foundations of mechanism design theory"
Eric S. Maskin (b. 1950)	United States	"for having laid the foundations of mechanism design theory"
Roger Myerson (b. 1951)	United States	"for having laid the foundations of mechanism design theory"

== Controversies ==
=== Chemistry ===
Ertl, who solely won the Chemistry Prize, showed both surprise and disappointment that Gábor Somorjai, a foundational pioneer in modern surface science and catalysis, wasn't named for the prize alongside him. Somorjai and Ertl had previously shared the Wolf Prize for Chemistry in 1998. The Nobel Foundation's decision to exclude Somorjai was criticized in the scientific community.
