= 2019 Nobel Prizes =

The 2019 Nobel Prizes were awarded by the Nobel Foundation, based in Sweden in six categories: Physics, Chemistry, Physiology or Medicine, Literature, Peace, and Economic Sciences.

Nobel Week took place from December 6 to 12, including programming such as lectures, dialogues, and discussions. The award ceremony and banquet for the Peace Prize were scheduled in Oslo on December 10, while the award ceremony and banquet for all other categories were scheduled for the same day in Stockholm.

== Prizes ==
=== Physics ===
Awardee(s)
| James Peebles (b. 1935) | Canadian American | "for theoretical discoveries in physical cosmology" |
| Michel Mayor (b. 1942) | Swiss | "for the discovery of an exoplanet orbiting a solar-type star" |
| Didier Queloz (b. 1966) | Swiss | "for the discovery of an exoplanet orbiting a solar-type star" |

=== Chemistry ===
Awardee(s)
| John B. Goodenough (1922–2023) | American | "for the development of lithium ion batteries" |
| M. Stanley Whittingham (b. 1941) | British American | "for the development of lithium ion batteries" |
| Akira Yoshino (b. 1948) | Japanese | "for the development of lithium ion batteries" |

=== Physiology or Medicine ===
Awardee(s)
| William Kaelin Jr. (b. 1957) | United States | "for their discoveries of how cells sense and adapt to oxygen availability" |
| Peter J. Ratcliffe (b. 1954) | United Kingdom | "for their discoveries of how cells sense and adapt to oxygen availability" |
| Gregg L. Semenza (b. 1956) | United States | "for their discoveries of how cells sense and adapt to oxygen availability" |

=== Literature ===
| Awardee(s) | | |
|---|---|---|
| Peter Handke (b. 1942) | Austria | "for an influential work that with linguistic ingenuity has explored the periphery and the specificity of human experience" |

=== Peace ===
Awardee(s)
| Abiy Ahmed (b. 1976) | Ethiopia | "for his efforts to achieve peace and international cooperation, and in particular for his decisive initiative to resolve the border conflict with neighbouring Eritrea." |

=== Economic Sciences ===
Awardee(s)
| Abhijit Banerjee (b. 1961) | United States | "for their experimental approach to alleviating global poverty" |
| Esther Duflo (b. 1972) | France United States | "for their experimental approach to alleviating global poverty" |
| Michael Kremer (b. 1964) | United States | "for their experimental approach to alleviating global poverty" |

== Controversies ==
=== Chemistry ===
Some questioned the Chemistry Prize's awarding to three scientists without award or acknowledgement to Rachid Yazami, a scientist whose research on the lithium-ion battery was similarly crucial to those recognized.

=== Literature ===
Handke's awarding of the Literature Prize was scrutinized for his historic denying of the Bosnian genocide, as well as his affinity for Slobodan Milošević. Several authors, historians, and organizations, including PEN International condemned the Nobel Foundation's decision. Additionally, the governments of Bosnia and Herzegovina, Kosovo, and Turkey issued condemnations against the award, and the ambassadors from Albania, Bosnia, Croatia, Kosovo, North Macedonia, and Turkey boycotted the award ceremony.
