= 2012 Nobel Prizes =

The 2012 Nobel Prizes were awarded by the Nobel Foundation, based in Sweden. Six categories were awarded: Physics, Chemistry, Physiology or Medicine, Literature, Peace, and Economic Sciences.

Nobel Week took place from December 6 to 12, including programming such as lectures, dialogues, and discussions. The award ceremony and banquet for the Peace Prize were scheduled in Oslo on December 10, while the award ceremony and banquet for all other categories were scheduled for the same day in Stockholm.

== Prizes ==
=== Physics ===
Awardee(s)
Serge Haroche (b. 1944)	French	"for ground-breaking experimental methods that enable measuring and manipulation of individual quantum systems."
David J. Wineland (b. 1944)	American	"for ground-breaking experimental methods that enable measuring and manipulation of individual quantum systems."

=== Chemistry ===
Awardee(s)
Robert Lefkowitz (b. 1943)	American	"for studies of G-protein-coupled receptors"
Brian Kobilka (b. 1955)	American	"for studies of G-protein-coupled receptors"

=== Physiology or Medicine ===
Awardee(s)
	Sir John B. Gurdon (b. 1933)	United Kingdom	"for the discovery that mature cells can be reprogrammed to become pluripotent"
Shinya Yamanaka	Shinya Yamanaka (b. 1962)	Japan	"for the discovery that mature cells can be reprogrammed to become pluripotent"

=== Literature ===
Awardee(s)		
Mo Yan (b. 1955)	China	"who with hallucinatory realism merges folk tales, history and the contemporary"

=== Peace ===
Awardee(s)
European Union (founded 1958)	European Union	"for over six decades contributed to the advancement of peace and reconciliation, democracy and human rights in Europe."

=== Economic Sciences ===
Awardee(s)
Alvin E. Roth (b. 1951)	United States	"for the theory of stable allocations and the practice of market design"
Lloyd S. Shapley (1923–2016)	United States	"for the theory of stable allocations and the practice of market design"

== Controversies ==
=== Peace ===
The Peace Prize's awarding to the European Union drew various criticisms from Eurosceptics and both Europe's far-left and far-right; detractors questioned the union's alleged record of peacemaking activities and peace outcomes. Previous laureates Desmond Tutu, Mairead Maguire and Adolfo Pérez Esquivel, in an open letter written to the Nobel Foundation, also criticized the awarding on the basis of the European Union's imposition of "... security based on military force and waging wars rather than insisting on the need for an alternative approach".
