= 1990 Nobel Prizes =

The 1990 Nobel Prizes were awarded by the Nobel Foundation, based in Sweden. Six categories were awarded: Physics, Chemistry, Physiology or Medicine, Literature, Peace, and Economic Sciences.

== Prizes ==
=== Physics ===
Awardee(s)
| Jerome I. Friedman (b. 1930) | American | "for their pioneering investigations concerning deep inelastic scattering of electrons on protons and bound neutrons, which have been of essential importance for the development of the quark model in particle physics" |
| Henry Way Kendall (1926–1999) | American | "for their pioneering investigations concerning deep inelastic scattering of electrons on protons and bound neutrons, which have been of essential importance for the development of the quark model in particle physics" |
| Richard E. Taylor (1929–2018) | Canadian | "for their pioneering investigations concerning deep inelastic scattering of electrons on protons and bound neutrons, which have been of essential importance for the development of the quark model in particle physics" |

=== Chemistry ===
Awardee(s)
| Elias James Corey (b. 1928) | American | "for his development of the theory and methodology of organic synthesis" |

=== Physiology or Medicine ===
Awardee(s)
| Joseph E. Murray (1919–2012) | United States | "for their discoveries concerning organ and cell transplantation in the treatment of human disease" |
| E. Donnall Thomas (1920–2012) | United States | "for their discoveries concerning organ and cell transplantation in the treatment of human disease" |

=== Literature ===
| Awardee(s) | | |
|---|---|---|
| Octavio Paz (1914–1998) | Mexico | "for impassioned writing with wide horizons, characterized by sensuous intelligence and humanistic integrity" |

=== Peace ===
Awardee(s)
| Mikhail Gorbachev (1931–2022) | Soviet Union | "for the leading role he played in the radical changes in East-West relations." |

=== Economic Sciences ===
Awardee(s)
| Harry Markowitz (1927–2023) | United States | "for their pioneering work in the theory of financial economics" |
| Merton Miller (1923–2000) | United States | "for their pioneering work in the theory of financial economics" |
| William F. Sharpe (b. 1934) | United States | "for their pioneering work in the theory of financial economics" |
