= 1991 Nobel Prizes =

The 1991 Nobel Prizes were awarded by the Nobel Foundation, based in Sweden. Six categories were awarded: Physics, Chemistry, Physiology or Medicine, Literature, Peace, and Economic Sciences.

== Prizes ==
=== Physics ===
Awardee(s)
Pierre-Gilles de Gennes (1932–2007)	French	"for discovering that methods developed for studying order phenomena in simple systems can be generalized to more complex forms of matter, in particular to liquid crystals and polymers"

=== Chemistry ===
Awardee(s)
Richard R. Ernst	Richard R. Ernst (1933–2021)	Swiss	"for his contributions to the development of the methodology of high resolution nuclear magnetic resonance (NMR) spectroscopy"

=== Physiology or Medicine ===
Awardee(s)
Erwin Neher (b. 1944)	Germany	"for their discoveries concerning the function of single ion channels in cells"
Bert Sakmann (b. 1942)	Germany	"for their discoveries concerning the function of single ion channels in cells"

=== Literature ===
Awardee(s)		
Nadine Gordimer (1923–2014)	South Africa	"who through her magnificent epic writing has – in the words of Alfred Nobel – been of very great benefit to humanity"

=== Peace ===
Awardee(s)
Aung San Suu Kyi (born 1945)	Myanmar	"for her non-violent struggle for democracy and human rights."

=== Economic Sciences ===
Awardee(s)
Ronald Coase (1910–2013)	United Kingdom	"for his discovery and clarification of the significance of transaction costs and property rights for the institutional structure and functioning of the economy"
