= 2026 Nobel Prizes =

The 2026 Nobel Prizes were awarded by the Nobel Foundation, based in Sweden, and the Norwegian Nobel Institute, based in Oslo, to 10 individuals.

== Prizes ==
Prize	Recipient(s)	Reason
Physics	(Belgium) (United States) Francis Halzen	"for decisive contributions to the IceCube Neutrino Observatory and the discovery of high-energy neutrinos of astrophysical origin"
Physiology or Medicine	(United States) Karl Deisseroth	"for their discoveries concerning light-gated ion channels and optogenetics".
Physiology or Medicine	(Germany) Georg Nagel	"for their discoveries concerning light-gated ion channels and optogenetics".
Physiology or Medicine	(Germany) Peter Hegemann	"for their discoveries concerning light-gated ion channels and optogenetics".
Peace	(South Africa) Navi Pillay	"for her efforts to promote peace and international law."
Literature	(Canada) Anne Carson	"for her bold and inventive oeuvre that, in playful dialogue with the classical tradition, has created new forms for contemporary literature".
Chemistry	(France) Henri B. Kagan	"for the discovery of non-linear effects and autocatalysis in asymmetric organic synthesis."
Chemistry	(Japan) Kensō Soai	"for the discovery of non-linear effects and autocatalysis in asymmetric organic synthesis."
Economic Sciences	(United States) Robert Hall	"for microeconomic foundations of macroeconomic stabilisation."
Economic Sciences	(United States) Michael Woodford	"for microeconomic foundations of macroeconomic stabilisation."
