= 2005 Nobel Prizes =

The 2005 Nobel Prizes were awarded by the Nobel Foundation, based in Sweden. Six categories were awarded: Physics, Chemistry, Physiology or Medicine, Literature, Peace, and Economic Sciences. Typically announced in early October alongside the other prizes, the Literature Prize experienced a delay.

Nobel Week took place from December 6 to 12, including programming such as lectures, dialogues, and discussions. The award ceremony and banquet for the Peace Prize were scheduled in Oslo on December 10, while the award ceremony and banquet for all other categories were scheduled for the same day in Stockholm.

== Prizes ==
=== Physics ===
Awardee(s)
Roy J. Glauber (1925–2018)	American	"for his contribution to the quantum theory of optical coherence"
John L. Hall (b. 1934)	American	"for their contributions to the development of laser-based precision spectroscopy, including the optical frequency comb technique"
Theodor W. Hänsch (b. 1941)	German	"for their contributions to the development of laser-based precision spectroscopy, including the optical frequency comb technique"

=== Chemistry ===
Awardee(s)
	Yves Chauvin (1930–2015)	French	"for the development of the metathesis method in organic synthesis"
Robert Grubbs	Robert H. Grubbs (1942–2021)	American	"for the development of the metathesis method in organic synthesis"
	Richard R. Schrock (b. 1945)	American	"for the development of the metathesis method in organic synthesis"

=== Physiology or Medicine ===
Awardee(s)
Barry J. Marshall (b. 1951)	Australia	"for their discovery of the bacterium Helicobacter pylori and its role in gastritis and peptic ulcer disease"
J. Robin Warren (1937–2024)	Australia	"for their discovery of the bacterium Helicobacter pylori and its role in gastritis and peptic ulcer disease"

=== Literature ===
Awardee(s)		
Harold Pinter (1930–2008)	United Kingdom	"who in his plays uncovers the precipice under everyday prattle and forces entry into oppression's closed rooms"

=== Peace ===
Awardee(s)
International Atomic Energy Agency (founded 1957)	United Nations	"for their efforts to prevent nuclear energy from being used for military purposes and to ensure that nuclear energy for peaceful purposes is used in the safest possible way."
Mohamed ElBaradei (born 1942)	Egypt	"for their efforts to prevent nuclear energy from being used for military purposes and to ensure that nuclear energy for peaceful purposes is used in the safest possible way."

=== Economic Sciences ===
Awardee(s)
Robert J. Aumann (b. 1930)	United States Israel	"for having enhanced our understanding of conflict and cooperation through game-theory analysis"
Thomas C. Schelling (1921–2016)	United States	"for having enhanced our understanding of conflict and cooperation through game-theory analysis"

== Controversies ==
=== Literature ===
Pinter's lecture, titled "Art, Truth, and Politics", was delivered by video due to Pinter's hospitalization which made traveling to Stockholm unsuitable. 46 minutes in length, the lecture addressed many topics, including "political language" and American foreign policy, which subsequently provoked much discourse and criticism, as well as accusations of Pinter's "anti-Americanism."
