= Oscar Marín =

Spanish neuroscientist (born 1971)

Oscar Marín Parra
- Born: March 31, 1971 (age 55); Madrid, Spain
- Education: Complutense University of Madrid
- Scientific career
- Fields: Neuroscience
- Workplaces: King's College London

Oscar Marín Parra FMedSci FRS (born 31 March 1971) is a Spanish and British neuroscientist. He is married to neuroscientist Beatriz Rico.

== Education ==
Oscar Marín was born in Madrid and received his undergraduate degree in Biology from Universidad Complutense de Madrid, and later his PhD in neuroscience. He then undertook postdoctoral training with María Ángela Nieto at the Instituto Cajal and John L. Rubenstein and Marc Tessier-Lavigne at the University of California in San Francisco.

== Research and career ==
Before being appointed Professor of Neuroscience at King's College London in 2014, Marín started his career at the Instituto de Neurociencias in Alicante (Spain) between 2003 and 2014. He has directed the Centre for Developmental Neurobiology at King's since 2014, and the MRC Centre for Neurodevelopmental Disorders since 2016.

Marín is known for his discoveries concerning the specification, migration, and wiring of neurons in the cerebral cortex, with special reference to the development of inhibitory interneurons. These discoveries have provided a novel conceptual paradigm, linking aberrant brain development with the origin of neurodevelopmental disorders, such as autism and schizophrenia.

== Awards and honours ==
In 2004, Marín received the European Young Investigator Award (EURYI) in its first round. In 2011 he received the Rey Jaime I Award and in 2012 the FENS-EJN Young Investigator Award. In 2014 Marín received the Roger de Spoelberch Award for his work on the neurobiology of schizophrenia. In 2017 Marín received the Ramón y Cajal Medal from the Spanish Royal Academy of Sciences, and the Remedios Caro Almela Award in 2019. In 2023, he received the ECNP Neuropsychopharmacology Award in Basic Science Research and in 2024, Marín was awarded the prestigious FENS-EJN Prize.

Marín was elected a member of the European Molecular Biology Organization (EMBO) in 2010, and a member of the Academy of Medical Sciences in 2020. In 2022 he was elected a Fellow of the Royal Society. Marín was a founding member of the European Research Council.
