= 1995 Nobel Prizes =

The 1995 Nobel Prizes were awarded by the Nobel Foundation, based in Sweden. Six categories were awarded: Physics, Chemistry, Physiology or Medicine, Literature, Peace, and Economic Sciences.

Nobel Week took place from December 6 to 12, including programming such as lectures, dialogues, and discussions. The award ceremony and banquet for the Peace Prize were scheduled in Oslo on December 10, while the award ceremony and banquet for all other categories were scheduled for the same day in Stockholm.

== Prizes ==
=== Physics ===
Awardee(s)
Martin Lewis Perl (1927–2014)	American	"for the discovery of the tau lepton" and "for pioneering experimental contributions to lepton physics"
Frederick Reines (1918–1998)	American	"for the detection of the neutrino" and "for pioneering experimental contributions to lepton physics"

=== Chemistry ===
Awardee(s)
Paul J. Crutzen (1933–2021)	Dutch	"for their work in atmospheric chemistry, particularly concerning the formation and decomposition of ozone"
Mario J. Molina (1943–2020)	Mexican	"for their work in atmospheric chemistry, particularly concerning the formation and decomposition of ozone"
Frank Sherwood Rowland (1927–2012)	American	"for their work in atmospheric chemistry, particularly concerning the formation and decomposition of ozone"

=== Physiology or Medicine ===
Awardee(s)
Edward B. Lewis (1918–2004)	United States	"for their discoveries concerning the genetic control of early embryonic development"
Christiane Nüsslein-Volhard (b. 1942)	Germany	"for their discoveries concerning the genetic control of early embryonic development"
Eric F. Wieschaus (b. 1947)	United States	"for their discoveries concerning the genetic control of early embryonic development"

=== Literature ===
Awardee(s)		
Seamus Heaney (1939–2013)	Ireland	"for works of lyrical beauty and ethical depth, which exalt everyday miracles and the living past"

=== Peace ===
Awardee(s)
Joseph Rotblat (1908–2005)	Poland	"for their efforts to diminish the part played by nuclear arms in international politics and, in the longer run, to eliminate such arms."
Pugwash Conferences on Science and World Affairs	Canada	"for their efforts to diminish the part played by nuclear arms in international politics and, in the longer run, to eliminate such arms."

=== Economic Sciences ===
Awardee(s)
Robert Lucas, Jr. (1937–2023)	United States	"for having developed and applied the hypothesis of rational expectations, and thereby having transformed macroeconomic analysis and deepened our understanding of economic policy"
