= Gertrude Neumark =

American physicist (1927–2010)

Gertrude Fanny Neumark
- Born: April 29, 1927; Nuremberg, Germany
- Died: November 11, 2010 (aged 83)
- Occupation: Physicist
- Awards: SIAM Fellow

Academic background
- Education: Barnard College (BA); Radcliffe College (MA); Columbia University (PhD)
- Thesis: Free cloud approximation to molecular orbital calculations (1951)

Gertrude Fanny Neumark, also known as Gertrude Neumark Rothschild, (April 29, 1927 – November 11, 2010) was an American physicist, most noted for her work in material science and physics of semiconductors with emphasis on optical and electrical properties of wide-bandgap semiconductors and their light-emitting devices.

== Personal life ==
She was born in Nuremberg, Germany in 1927. Her family, who were Jewish, left Germany in 1935. Her father Sigmund’s naturalization papers indicate that she arrived with him and her mother Bertha in Miami from Cuba on SS Florida January 3, 1940. He lists Cuba as their last place of residence.

She died on November 11, 2010, at age 83, due to heart failure.

== Education ==
Neumark graduated B.A. summa cum laude (chemistry) from Barnard College in 1948 and M.A. (chemistry) at Radcliffe College in the following year. She completed her Ph.D. in chemistry at Columbia University in 1951; her thesis entitled "Free cloud approximation to molecular orbital calculations".

== Career ==
Following her PhD, she joined the Sylvania Research Laboratories in Bayside, NY as a senior physicist. In 1960, she moved to the Philips Laboratories, Briarcliff Manor, New York, where she worked until 1985. She was elected a Fellow of the American Physical Society in 1982. From 1982 to 1985, she was visiting-adjunct professor of materials science at Columbia University, and became a full professor of materials science there in 1985.

In 1999, she became the Howe Professor Emerita of Materials Science and Engineering and professor emerita of applied physics and mathematics at Columbia University.

== Research and patents ==
In the 1980s, Neumark began studying the optical properties of wide-bandgap semiconductors and developed diodes capable of using the upper range of the spectrum and serving as a superior light source. The new short-wavelength LEDs, emitting blue, green, violet and ultraviolet light, turned out to be much more energy efficient, reliable and long-lived while the short-wavelength-emitting laser diodes could store vastly more information more compactly. This new technology lent itself to a wide variety of applications, from billboards and traffic lights to hand-held mobile devices and high-definition DVD players. Her research led to remarkable advances in the field of electronics, including establishing blue, green, and ultraviolet LEDs as common components in electronics.

She holds a number of patents on wide-bandgap semiconductor technology, though faced challenges in having her work recognized.

In relation with infringing on two of her semiconductor patents, she had to file lawsuits against several electronics companies, including the Philips Lumileds Lighting Company, Epistar, Toyoda Gosei and Osram in 2005, which were subsequently settled out of court. In 2008, Neumark again had to file a complaint seeking to block imports into the United States of a range of products that she said were infringing her patents on wide-bandgap semiconductor technology, resulting in a number of companies agreeing to license the patents. According to family members, the suits were not about money but about fairness—especially for women scientists—she thought were being discriminated against.

== Additional Reading ==
- Tietjen, Jill S.; Ozturk, Mehmet C. (2026). "Chapter 3: Gertrude "Fanny" Neumark Rothschild (1927-2010)". Pioneering Women of Solid-State Physics: Breaking Boundaries. Springer Cham. ISBN 978-3-032-18112-1.
