= Nobel Foundation =

Private institution managing the finances and administration of the Nobel Prizes

Coordinates: 59.3376°N 18.0744°E

- The Nobel Foundation crest
- Formation: 29 June 1900; 126 years ago
- Headquarters: Stockholm, Sweden
- Website: nobelprize.org/the-nobel-foundation

The Nobel Foundation (Note: Swedish: Nobelstiftelsen) is a private institution founded on 29 June 1900 to manage the finances and administration of the Nobel Prizes. The foundation is based on the last will of Alfred Nobel, the inventor of dynamite.

It also holds Nobel Symposia on important breakthroughs in science and topics of cultural or social significance.

== History ==
Alfred Nobel (Alfred Bernhard Nobel; born 21 October 1833, in Stockholm, Sweden) was a chemist, engineer, innovator, armaments manufacturer and the inventor of dynamite. He owned Bofors, a major armaments manufacturer, which he had redirected from its original business as an iron and steel mill. Nobel held 355 different patents, dynamite being the most famous. Nobel amassed a sizeable personal fortune during his lifetime, thanks mostly to this invention. In 1896 Nobel died of a stroke in his villa in San Remo, Italy, where he had lived his final years.

Nobel's will expressed a request, to the surprise of many, that his money be used for prizes in physics, chemistry, peace, physiology or medicine and literature. Though Nobel wrote several wills during his lifetime, the last was written a little over a year before he died, and signed at the Swedish-Norwegian Club in Paris on 27 November 1895. Nobel bequeathed 94% of his total assets, 31 million Swedish kronor, to establish and endow the five Nobel Prizes.

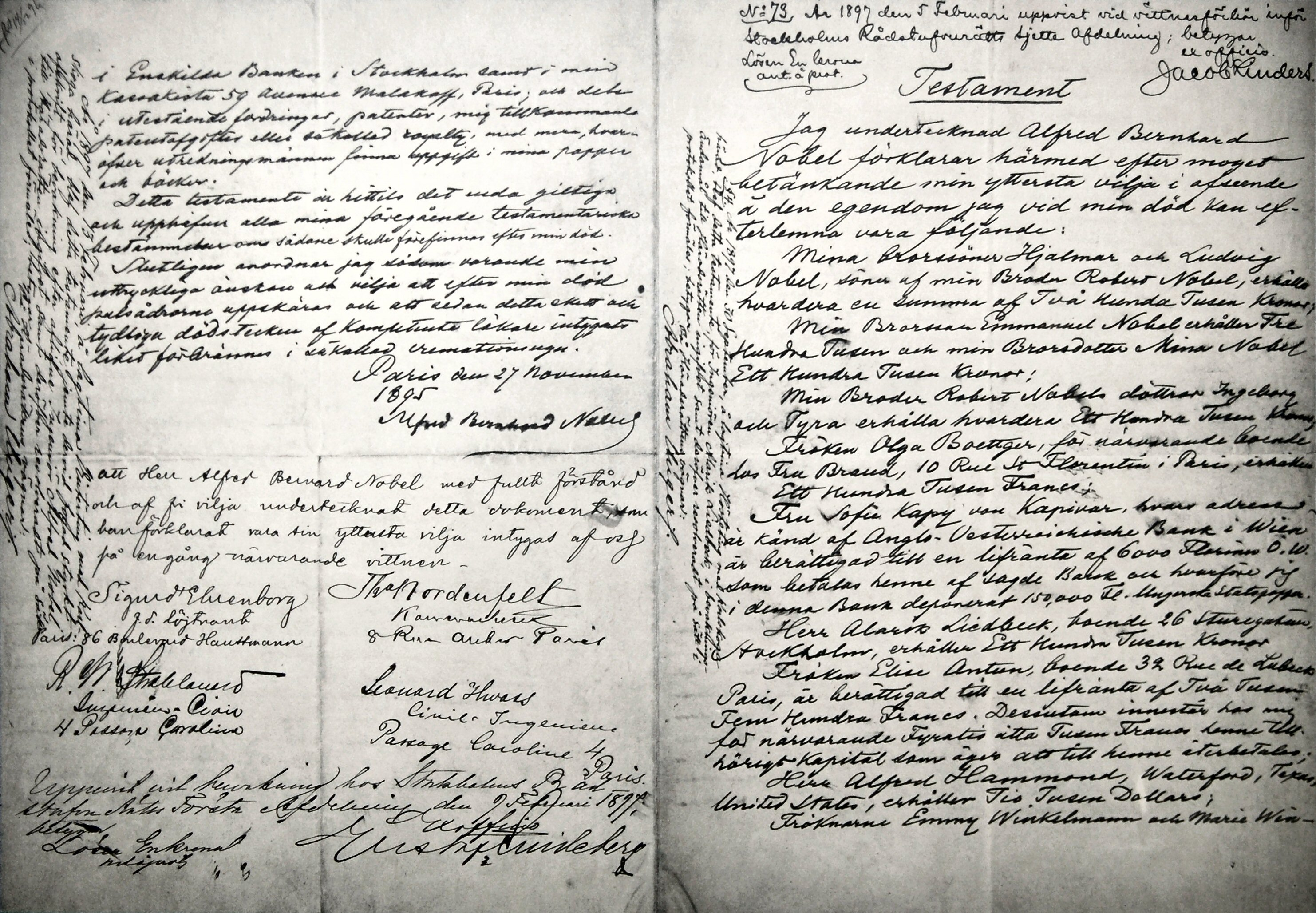
Alfred Nobel's will from 25 November 1895

"The whole of my remaining realizable estate shall be dealt with in the following way:

The capital shall be invested by my executors in safe securities and shall constitute a fund, the interest on which shall be annually distributed in the form of prizes to those who, during the preceding year, shall have conferred the greatest benefit on mankind. The said interest shall be divided into five equal parts, which shall be apportioned as follows: one part to the person who shall have made the most important discovery or invention within the field of physics; one part to the person who shall have made the most important chemical discovery or improvement; one part to the person who shall have made the most important discovery within the domain of physiology or medicine; one part to the person who shall have produced in the field of literature the most outstanding work of an idealistic tendency; and one part to the person who shall have done the most or the best work for fraternity among nations, for the abolition or reduction of standing armies and for the holding and promotion of peace congresses.

The prizes for physics and chemistry shall be awarded by the Swedish Academy of Sciences; that for physiological or medical works by Karolinska Institutet in Stockholm; that for literature by the Academy in Stockholm; and that for champions of peace by a committee of five persons to be elected by the Norwegian Storting. It is my expressed wish that in awarding the prizes no consideration whatever shall be given to the nationality of the candidates, so that the most worthy shall receive the prize, whether he be Scandinavian or not."

— Alfred Nobel, Alfred Nobel's Will

The executors of his will were Ragnar Sohlman and Rudolf Lilljequist who formed the Nobel Foundation to take care of Nobel's fortune and organize the prizes. Although Nobel's will established the prizes, his plan was incomplete and, because of various other hurdles, it took five years before the Nobel Foundation could be established and the first prizes could be awarded on 10 December 1901 to, among others, Wilhelm Conrad Röntgen. At the end of 2024, the Foundation's investment capital amounted to 6.6 billion Swedish kronor, or about $US 700 million.

=== The Nobel Foundation ===
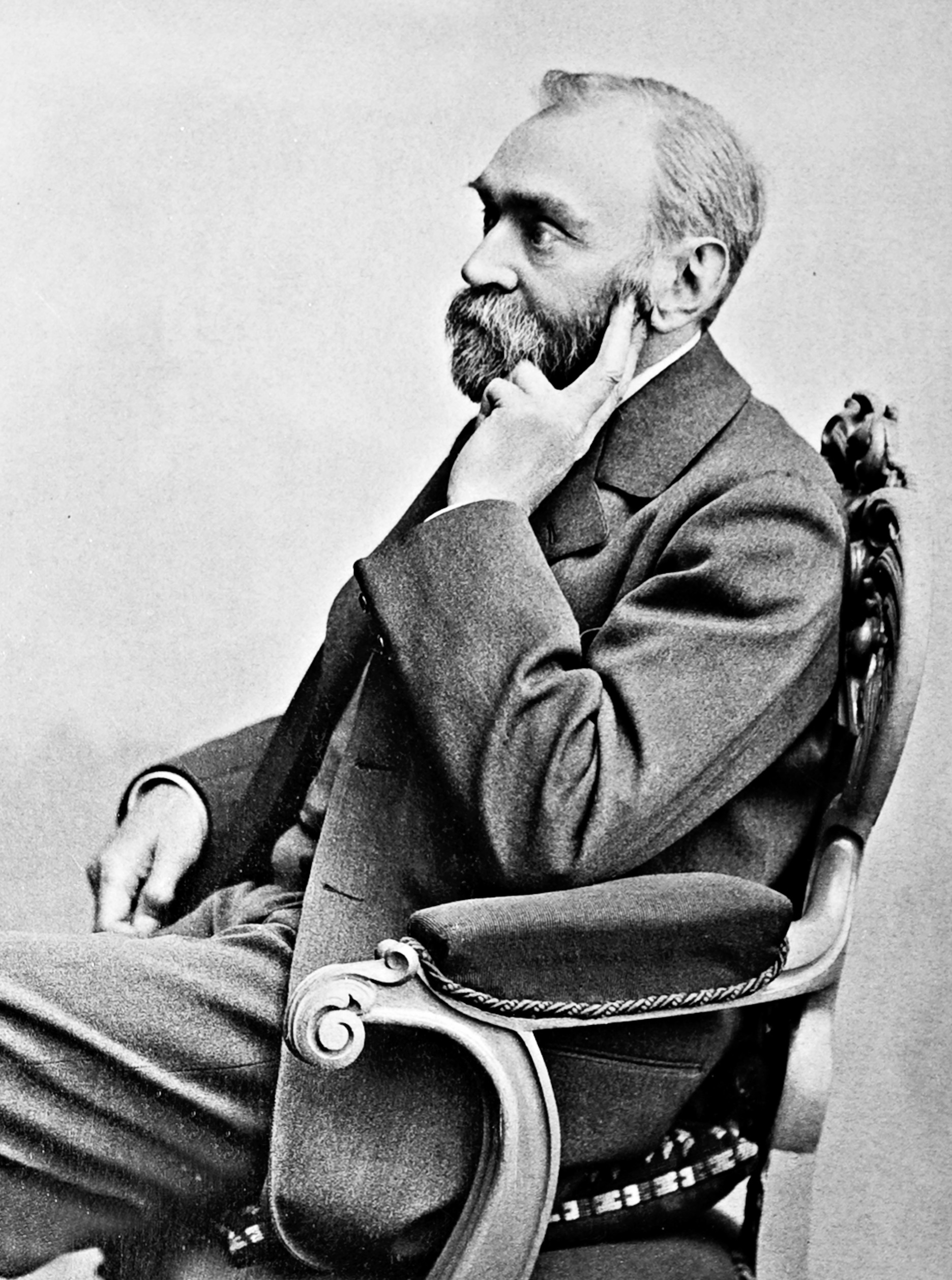
Portrait of Alfred Nobel by Gösta Florman

The Nobel Foundation was founded as a private organisation on 29 June 1900 specifically to manage the finances and administration of the Nobel Prizes. It is based on Nobel's last will and testament. At the time Nobel's will led to much skepticism and criticism and thus it was not until 26 April 1897 that his will was approved by the Storting. Soon thereafter they appointed the members of the Norwegian Nobel Committee that was to award the Peace Prize. Shortly after, the other prize-awarding organizations followed; Karolinska Institutet on 7 June, the Swedish Academy on 9 June and the Royal Swedish Academy of Sciences on 11 June. In 1900 the Nobel Foundation's newly created statutes were promulgated by King Oscar II.

In 1905 the union between Sweden and Norway was dissolved which meant the responsibility for awarding Nobel Prizes was split between the two countries. The Norwegian Nobel Committee continued to select the recipient of the Peace Prize, while Swedish bodies select the other prize recipients.

In accordance with Nobel's will, the primary task of the Nobel Foundation is to manage the fortune Nobel left after him in a fund. The Nobel Foundation also represents the Nobel Prize to the outside world and takes charge of informal activities and issues related to the awarding of the Nobel Prizes. The Nobel Foundation is not involved in the process of selecting the Nobel laureates. The Nobel Foundation invests money to maintain a funding base for the prizes and the administrative activities. The Nobel Foundation is exempt from all taxes in Sweden (since 1946) and from investment taxes in the United States (since 1953). At the beginning of the 1980s the award money was 1 million SEK but in 2008 the award money had increased to 10 million SEK.

According to the statutes of the Nobel Foundation, the Board of Directors will have its registered office in Stockholm. The Board consists of seven members and two deputies, Swedish or Norwegian citizens elected by the trustees of the prize-awarding institutions, and it chooses a Chairman, Vice-Chairman, and Executive Director from among its members. The prize-awarding institutions are the Royal Swedish Academy of Sciences, the Nobel Assembly at the Karolinska Institute, the Swedish Academy and the Norwegian Nobel Committee.

== Nobel Symposia ==
In 1965, the foundation initiated the Nobel Symposia, a program that holds symposia "devoted to areas of science where breakthroughs around the world are occurring or deal with other topics of primary cultural or social significance." The symposia has covered topics such as prostaglandins, chemical kinetics, diabetes mellitus, string theory, cosmology, and the Cold War in the 1980s. The Nobel Symposium Committee consists of members from the Nobel Committees in Chemistry, Literature, Peace, Physics, and Physiology or Medicine; the Prize Committee for Economics; the Bank of Sweden Tercentenary Foundation; and the Wallenberg Foundation.

== Other Nobel prizes announced by members of the Nobel family ==
In 2007, the Nobel Charitable Trust, founded by Michael Nobel, Gustaf Nobel, Peter Nobel, and Philip Nobel, announced their plans to establish a new Nobel prize, the Michael Nobel Energy Award, that will award innovations in alternative energy technology. It would be the first new Nobel prize established by the Nobel family since Alfred Nobel established his prizes. However, it would be awarded by the Nobel Charitable Trust and not by the Nobel Foundation, although both are organisations founded by the Nobel family.

The plan was announced at nanoTX 07. The Nobel Foundation quickly reacted by threatening legal action for "clear misuse of the reputation and goodwill of the Nobel Prize and the associations of integrity and eminence that has been created over time and through the efforts of the Nobel Committees". The director, Michael Sohlman, of the Nobel Foundation and the elected head of the Nobel family disapproved to the institution of the so-called 'Dr. Michael Nobel Award' as well as the Nobel Charitable Trust (NCT) and Nobel Family Benevolent society.

== See also ==
- Lars Ernster (1920–1998) – A professor of biochemistry and a former member of the Board of the Nobel Foundation
- Ragnar Sohlman
- List of wealthiest charitable foundations
- Nobel Conference
- Wolf Foundation
