= Kary Mullis =

American biochemist (1944–2019)

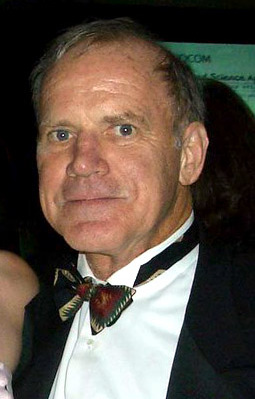
- Mullis in 2006
- Born: Kary Banks Mullis; December 28, 1944; Lenoir, North Carolina, U.S.
- Died: August 7, 2019 (aged 74); Newport Beach, California, U.S.
- Education: Georgia Institute of Technology (BS); University of California, Berkeley (PhD)
- Known for: Invention of polymerase chain reaction TaqMan
- Awards: William Allan Award (1990); Robert Koch Prize (1992); Nobel Prize in Chemistry (1993); Japan Prize (1993)
- Scientific career
- Fields: Molecular biology
- Workplaces: Cetus Corporation, Emeryville, California; Xytronyx, Inc., San Diego
- Thesis: Schizokinen: structure and synthetic work (1973)
- Doctoral advisor: J. B. Neilands
- Website: karymullis.com

Kary Banks Mullis (December 28, 1944 – August 7, 2019) was an American biochemist. In recognition of his role in the invention of the polymerase chain reaction (PCR) technique, he shared the 1993 Nobel Prize in Chemistry with Michael Smith and was awarded the Japan Prize in the same year. PCR became a central technique in biochemistry and molecular biology, described by The New York Times as "highly original and significant, virtually dividing biology into the two epochs of before PCR and after PCR."

Mullis downplayed humans' role in climate change, expressed doubt that HIV is the cause of AIDS, and professed a belief in astrology and the paranormal. He also practiced clandestine chemistry by producing LSD. Mullis's unscientific statements about topics outside his area of expertise have been named by Skeptical Inquirer as an instance of "Nobel disease".

== Early life and education ==
Mullis was born in Lenoir, North Carolina, near the Blue Ridge Mountains, on December 28, 1944, to Cecil Banks Mullis and Bernice Barker Mullis. His family had a background in farming in this rural area. As a child, Mullis said, he was interested in observing organisms in the countryside. He and his cousins would often taunt livestock by feeding them through electric fences, and Kary was mostly interested in the spiders in his grandparents' basement. He grew up in Columbia, South Carolina, where he attended Dreher High School, graduating in the class of 1962. He recalled his interest in chemistry beginning when he learned how to chemically synthesize and build solid fuel propulsion rockets as a high school student during the 1960s.

He earned a Bachelor of Science in chemistry from the Georgia Institute of Technology in Atlanta in 1966, during which time he married his first wife, Richards Haley, and started a business. He earned his PhD in 1973 in biochemistry at the University of California, Berkeley (UC Berkeley), in J. B. Neilands' laboratory, which focused on synthesis and structure of bacterial iron transporter molecules. Although he published a sole-author paper in Nature in the field of astrophysics in 1968, he struggled to pass his oral exams (with a colleague recalling that "He didn't get his propositions right. He didn't know general biochemistry"), and his dissertation was accepted only after several friends pitched in to "cut all the whacko stuff out of it" while his advisor lobbied the committee to reconsider its initial decision.

His doctoral dissertation was on the structure of the bacterial siderophore schizokinen. J. B. Neilands was known for his groundbreaking work on siderophores, and Mullis was a part of that with his characterization of schizokinen. Following his graduation, Mullis completed postdoctoral fellowships in pediatric cardiology at the University of Kansas Medical Center (1973–1977) and pharmaceutical chemistry at the University of California, San Francisco (1977–1979).

== Career ==
After receiving his doctorate, Mullis briefly left science to write fiction before accepting the University of Kansas fellowship. During his postdoctoral work, he managed a bakery for two years. Mullis returned to science at the encouragement of UC Berkeley friend and colleague Thomas White, who secured Mullis's UCSF position and later helped Mullis land a position with the biotechnology company Cetus Corporation of Emeryville, California. Despite little experience in molecular biology, Mullis worked as a DNA chemist at Cetus for seven years, ultimately serving as head of the DNA synthesis lab under White, then the firm's director of molecular and biological research; it was there, in 1983, that Mullis invented the polymerase chain reaction (PCR) procedure.

Mullis acquired a reputation for erratic behavior at Cetus, once threatening to bring a gun to work; he also engaged in "public lovers' quarrels" with his then-girlfriend (a fellow chemist at the company) and "nearly came to blows with another scientist" at a staff party, according to California Magazine. White recalled: "It definitely put me in a tough spot. His behavior was so outrageous that the other scientists thought that the only reason I didn't fire him outright was that he was a friend of mine."

After resigning from Cetus in 1986, Mullis served as director of molecular biology for Xytronyx, Inc. in San Diego for two years. While inventing a UV-sensitive ink at Xytronyx, he became skeptical of the existence of the ozone hole.

Thereafter, Mullis worked intermittently as a consultant for multiple corporations and institutions on nucleic acid chemistry and as an expert witness specializing in DNA profiling. In 1992, Mullis founded a business to sell pieces of jewelry containing the amplified DNA of deceased famous people such as Elvis Presley and Marilyn Monroe. In the same year, he also founded Atomic Tags in La Jolla, California. The venture sought to develop technology using atomic-force microscopy and bar-coded antibodies tagged with heavy metals to create highly multiplexed, parallel immunoassays.

Mullis was a member of the USA Science and Engineering Festival's Advisory Board. In 2014, he was named a distinguished researcher at the Children's Hospital Oakland Research Institute in Oakland, California.

=== PCR (polymerase chain reaction) and other inventions ===
In 1983, Mullis was working for Cetus Corporation as a chemist. Mullis recalled that, while driving in the vicinity of his country home in Mendocino County (with his girlfriend, who also was a chemist at Cetus), he had the idea to use a pair of primers to bracket the desired DNA sequence and to copy it using DNA polymerase; a technique that would allow rapid amplification of a small stretch of DNA and become a standard procedure in molecular biology laboratories. Longtime professional benefactor and supervisor Thomas White reassigned Mullis from his usual projects to concentrate on PCR full-time after the technique was met with skepticism by their colleagues. Mullis succeeded in demonstrating PCR on December 16, 1983, but the staff remained circumspect as he continued to produce ambiguous results amid alleged methodological problems, including a perceived lack of "appropriate controls and repetition." In his Nobel Prize lecture, he remarked that the December 16 breakthrough did not make up for his girlfriend breaking up with him: "I was sagging as I walked out to my little silver Honda Civic. Neither [assistant] Fred, empty Beck's bottles, nor the sweet smell of the dawn of the age of PCR could replace Jenny. I was lonesome."

Other Cetus scientists who were regarded as "top-notch experimentalists", including Randall Saiki, Henry Erlich, and Norman Arnheim, were placed on parallel PCR projects to work on determining if PCR could amplify a specific human gene (betaglobin) from genomic DNA. Saiki generated the needed data and Erlich authored the first paper to include use of the technique, while Mullis was still working on the paper that would describe PCR itself. Mullis's 1985 paper with Saiki and Erlich, "Enzymatic Amplification of β-globin Genomic Sequences and Restriction Site Analysis for Diagnosis of Sickle Cell Anemia" — the polymerase chain reaction invention (PCR) — was honored by a Citation for Chemical Breakthrough Award from the Division of History of Chemistry of the American Chemical Society in 2017.

A drawback of the technique was that the DNA polymerase in the reaction was destroyed by the high heat used at the start of each replication cycle and had to be replaced. In 1986, Saiki started to use Thermophilus aquaticus (Taq) DNA polymerase to amplify segments of DNA. The Taq polymerase was heat resistant and needed to be added to the reaction only once, making the technique dramatically more affordable and subject to automation. This modification of Mullis's invention revolutionized biochemistry, molecular biology, genetics, medicine, and forensics. UC Berkeley biologist David Bilder said, "PCR revolutionized everything. It really superpowered molecular biology—which then transformed other fields, even distant ones like ecology and evolution. … It's impossible to overstate PCR's impact. The ability to generate as much DNA of a specific sequence as you want, starting from a few simple chemicals and some temperature changes—it's just magical." Although he received a $10,000 bonus from Cetus for the invention, the company's later sale of the patent to Roche Molecular Systems for $300 million would lead Mullis to condemn White and members of the parallel team as "vultures."

Mullis also invented a UV-sensitive plastic that changes color in response to light.

He founded Altermune LLC in 2011 to pursue new ideas on the immune system. Mullis described the company's product thusly:

It is a method using specific synthetic chemical linkers to divert an immune response from its nominal target to something completely different which you would right now like to be temporarily immune to. Let's say you just got exposed to a new strain of the flu. You're already immune to alpha-1,3-galactosyl-galactose bonds. All humans are. Why not divert a fraction of those antibodies to the influenza strain you just picked up. A chemical linker synthesized with an alpha-1,3-gal-gal bond on one end and a DNA aptamer devised to bind specifically to the strain of influenza you have on the other end, will link anti-alpha-Gal antibodies to the influenza virus and presto, you have fooled your immune system into attacking the new virus.

In a TED Talk, Mullis describes how the US government paid $500,000 for Mullis to use this new technology against anthrax. He said the treatment was 100% effective, compared to the previous anthrax treatment which was 40% effective.

Another proof-of-principle of this technology, re-targeting pre-existing antibodies to the surface of a pathogenic strep bacterium using an alpha-gal modified aptamer ("alphamer"), was published in 2015 in collaboration with scientists at the University of California, San Diego. Mullis said he was inspired to fight this particular strep bacterium because it had killed his friend.

=== Accreditation of the PCR technique ===
A concept similar to that of PCR had been described before Mullis's work. Nobel laureate H. Gobind Khorana and Kjell Kleppe, a Norwegian scientist, authored a paper 17 years earlier describing a process they termed "repair replication" in the Journal of Molecular Biology. Using repair replication, Kleppe duplicated and then quadrupled a small synthetic molecule with the help of two primers and DNA polymerase. The method developed by Mullis used repeated thermal cycling, which allowed the rapid and exponential amplification of large quantities of any desired DNA sequence from an extremely complex template. Later a heat-stable DNA polymerase was incorporated into the process.

His co-workers at Cetus contested the notion that Mullis was solely responsible for the idea of using Taq polymerase in PCR. However, biochemist Richard T. Pon has written that the "full potential [of PCR] was not realized" until Mullis's work in 1983, and journalist Michael Gross states that Mullis's colleagues failed to see the potential of the technique when he presented it to them. As a result, some controversy surrounds the balance of credit that should be given to Mullis versus the team at Cetus. In practice, credit has accrued to both the inventor and the company (although not its individual workers) in the form of a Nobel Prize and a $10,000 Cetus bonus for Mullis and $300 million for Cetus when the company sold the patent to Roche Molecular Systems. After DuPont lost out to Roche on that sale, the company unsuccessfully disputed Mullis's patent on the alleged grounds that PCR had been previously described in 1971. Mullis and Erlich took Cetus' side in the case, and Khorana refused to testify for DuPont; the jury upheld Mullis's patent in 1991. However, in February 1999, the patent of Hoffman-La Roche (United States Patent No. 4,889,818) was found by the courts to be unenforceable, after Dr. Thomas Kunkel testified in the case Hoffman-La Roche v. Promega Corporation on behalf of the defendants (Promega Corporation) that "prior art" (i.e. articles on the subject of Taq polymerase published by other groups prior to the work of Gelfand and Stoffel, and their patent application covering the purification of Taq polymerase) existed, in the form of two articles, published by Alice Chien et al. in 1976, and A. S. Kaledin et al. in 1980.

The anthropologist Paul Rabinow wrote a book on the history of the PCR method in 1996, in which he discusses whether Mullis "invented" PCR or merely came up with the concept of it.

== Views on HIV/AIDS and climate change ==
In his 1998 autobiography, Mullis expressed disagreement with the scientific evidence for humans' role in climate change and ozone depletion. Mullis claimed that scientific theories about ozone depletion and climate change were the product of scientists and government bureaucrats conspiring to secure funding, saying that "science is being practiced by people who are dependent on being paid for what they are going to find out" instead of searching for the truth.

Mullis also questioned the scientific validity of the link between HIV and AIDS, despite never having done any scientific research on either subject, leading him widely being called an AIDS denialist. He wrote that he began to question the AIDS consensus while compiling a report for a project's sponsor and being unable to find a published reference for HIV being the cause of AIDS. Mullis published an alternative hypothesis for AIDS in 1994, claiming that AIDS is an arbitrary diagnosis used when HIV antibodies are found in a patient's blood. Seth Kalichman, AIDS researcher and author of Denying AIDS, names Mullis "among the who's who of AIDS pseudoscientists".

Mullis was often cited in the press as a supporter of molecular biologist and AIDS denialist Peter Duesberg. Mullis's HIV skepticism influenced Thabo Mbeki's denialist policies throughout his tenure as president of South Africa from 1999 to 2008, contributing to as many as 330,000 preventable deaths from AIDS and 35,000 babies born with HIV, which could have been prevented with ordinary prenatal HIV prevention.

Mullis's statements on HIV/AIDS and human-caused climate change have been described as an instance of "Nobel disease". Nobel disease is a tongue-in-cheek name for the behavior of some scientists who, after achieving success and recognition in their area of research, go on to make unfounded, sometimes bizarre statements in other areas, and embrace ideas that are scientifically implausible, rejected by most scientific experts, and based mostly on anecdotal or uncorroborated evidence. This has been seen especially in regard to contradicting the scientific consensus on climate change and ozone depletion.

== Use of hallucinogens ==
Mullis practiced clandestine chemistry throughout his graduate studies, specializing in the synthesis of LSD; according to his friend Tom White, "I knew he was a good chemist because he'd been synthesizing hallucinogenic drugs at UC Berkeley." He detailed his experiences synthesizing and testing various psychedelic amphetamines and a difficult trip on DET in his autobiography. In a Q&A interview published in the September 1994 issue of California Monthly, Mullis said, "Back in the 1960s and early 1970s I took plenty of LSD. A lot of people were doing that in Berkeley back then. And I found it to be a mind-opening experience. It was certainly much more important than any courses I ever took." During a symposium held for centenarian Albert Hofmann, Hofmann said Mullis had told him that LSD had "helped him develop the polymerase chain reaction that helps amplify specific DNA sequences".

== Interest in the paranormal ==
Mullis expressed interest in the paranormal. For example, he said that he had witnessed the "non-substantial form" of his deceased grandfather, even offering it a beer. In his autobiography, Mullis professed a belief in astrology and wrote about an encounter with a fluorescent, talking raccoon that he suggested might have been an extraterrestrial alien.

== Personal life ==
Mullis was a surfer as well as a musician, being both a guitarist and vocalist. He married four times, and he had three children by two of his wives. At the time of his death, he had two grandchildren and was survived by his fourth wife, Nancy (née Cosgrove). Mullis died on August 7, 2019, at his home in Newport Beach, California, from complications of pneumonia.

== Selected publications ==
- Mullis, Kary (May 1968). "Cosmological Significance of Time Reversal". Nature. 218 (5142): 663–664. Bibcode:1968Natur.218..663M. doi:10.1038/218663b0. ISSN 0028-0836. S2CID 4151884.
- Mullis, K.; Faloona, F.; Scharf, S.; Saiki, R.; Horn, G.; Erlich, H. (1986). "Specific Enzymatic Amplification of DNA In Vitro: The Polymerase Chain Reaction". Cold Spring Harbor Symposia on Quantitative Biology. 51: 263–273. doi:10.1101/SQB.1986.051.01.032. ISSN 0091-7451. PMID 3472723. S2CID 26180176.
- Mullis, Kary B. (April 1990). "The Unusual Origin of the Polymerase Chain Reaction". Scientific American. 262 (4): 56–65. Bibcode:1990SciAm.262d..56M. doi:10.1038/scientificamerican0490-56. ISSN 0036-8733. PMID 2315679.
- Mullis, Kary B.; Ferré, François; Gibbs, Richard A., eds. (1994). The Polymerase Chain Reaction. Boston: Birkhäuser Boston. ISBN 978-0-8176-3750-7 – via Google Books.
- Mullis, Kary B. (1995). "A hypothetical disease of the immune system that may bear some relation to the Acquired Immune Deficiency Syndrome" (PDF). Genetica. 95 (1–3): 195–197. doi:10.1007/bf01435010. ISSN 0016-6707. PMID 7744261. S2CID 28158163 – via University of Michigan.
- Mullis, Kary B. (1998). Dancing Naked in the Mind Field. New York: Pantheon Books. ISBN 978-0-679-44255-4. (Note: Mullis's autobiography gives his account of the commercial development of PCR, as well as providing insights into his opinions and experiences. In the book, Mullis chronicles his romantic relationships, use of LSD, synthesis and self-testing of novel psychoactive substances, belief in astrology and an encounter with an extraterrestrial in the form of a fluorescent raccoon.)

== Awards and honors ==
- 1990: William Allan Memorial Award of the American Society of Human Genetics, Preis Biochemische Analytik of the German Society of Clinical Chemistry and Boehringer Mannheim
- 1991: National Biotechnology Award, Gairdner Award, R&D Scientist of the Year, John Scott Award of the City Trusts of Philadelphia
- 1992: California Scientist of the Year Award
- 1992: Robert Koch Prize
- 1993: Nobel Prize in Chemistry, Japan Prize, Thomas A. Edison Award
- 1994: Honorary degree of Doctor of Science from the University of South Carolina
- 1994: Golden Plate Award of the American Academy of Achievement
- 1998: Inducted into the National Inventors Hall of Fame, Ronald H. Brown American Innovator Award
- 2004: Honorary degree in Pharmaceutical Biotechnology from the University of Bologna, Italy
- 2010: Honorary degree of Doctor honoris causa in the field of biological sciences from Masaryk University, Czech Republic

== See also ==
- COVID-19 misinformation § PCR testing
- History of the polymerase chain reaction method
- List of National Inventors Hall of Fame inductees
- List of Nobel laureates in Chemistry
- Nobel Prize controversies
  - Luc Montagnier, Nobel laureate who has promoted controversial and unverified health claims
