= Michael Gross =

Michael Gross may refer to:

- Michael Gross (artist) (1920–2004), Israeli painter, sculptor and conceptual artist
- Michael L. Gross (chemist) (born 1940), American professor of chemistry, medicine, and immunology
- Michael Gross (actor) (born 1947), American actor
- Michael Gross (journalist) (born 1952), American author and journalist
- Michael L. Gross (ethicist) (born 1954), political and medical ethicist
- Michael Gross (science writer) (born 1963), British science journalist
- Michael Joseph Gross (born 1970), American author and journalist
- Michael Gross (editor), television editor, writer, and director
- Michael C. Gross (1945–2015), American artist, film producer, art director of National Lampoon magazine
- Michael Gross (swimmer) (born 1964), German swimmer, multiple Olympic champion
