= Michael Groß =

Michael Groß may refer to:

- Michael Gross (swimmer)
- Michael Groß (politician)

== See also ==
- Michael Gross (disambiguation)
