= Oscar love curse =

Superstitious belief

The Oscar love curse or Oscar curse is a superstition that the woman who wins the Academy Award for Best Actress will have her boyfriend, fiancé, or husband cheat on her or divorce her soon after. It has also been applied to the Best Supporting Actress and to the Best Actor winner. A 2015 study found that divorce rates of female Oscar winners and nominees did not increase, but that divorce rates of male Oscar winners and nominees did.

Another version of an "Oscar curse" is that if an individual wins either a Best Actor/Actress or Best Supporting Actor/Actress award, their career will collapse shortly thereafter. Sources indicate that the originator of the superstition was Luise Rainer, who after winning two consecutive Oscars for Best Actress in the 1930s, had fewer roles in film afterwards, which she apparently blamed on receiving the awards. However, the same 2015 study on Oscar winner divorce rates also affirmed that "Oscar winners and Oscar nominees appear in more films following their Oscar experiences than do other actors".

== See also ==
- Nobel Prize effect
- Superman curse
