= Ne supra crepidam =

Warning to avoid passing judgement beyond one's expertise

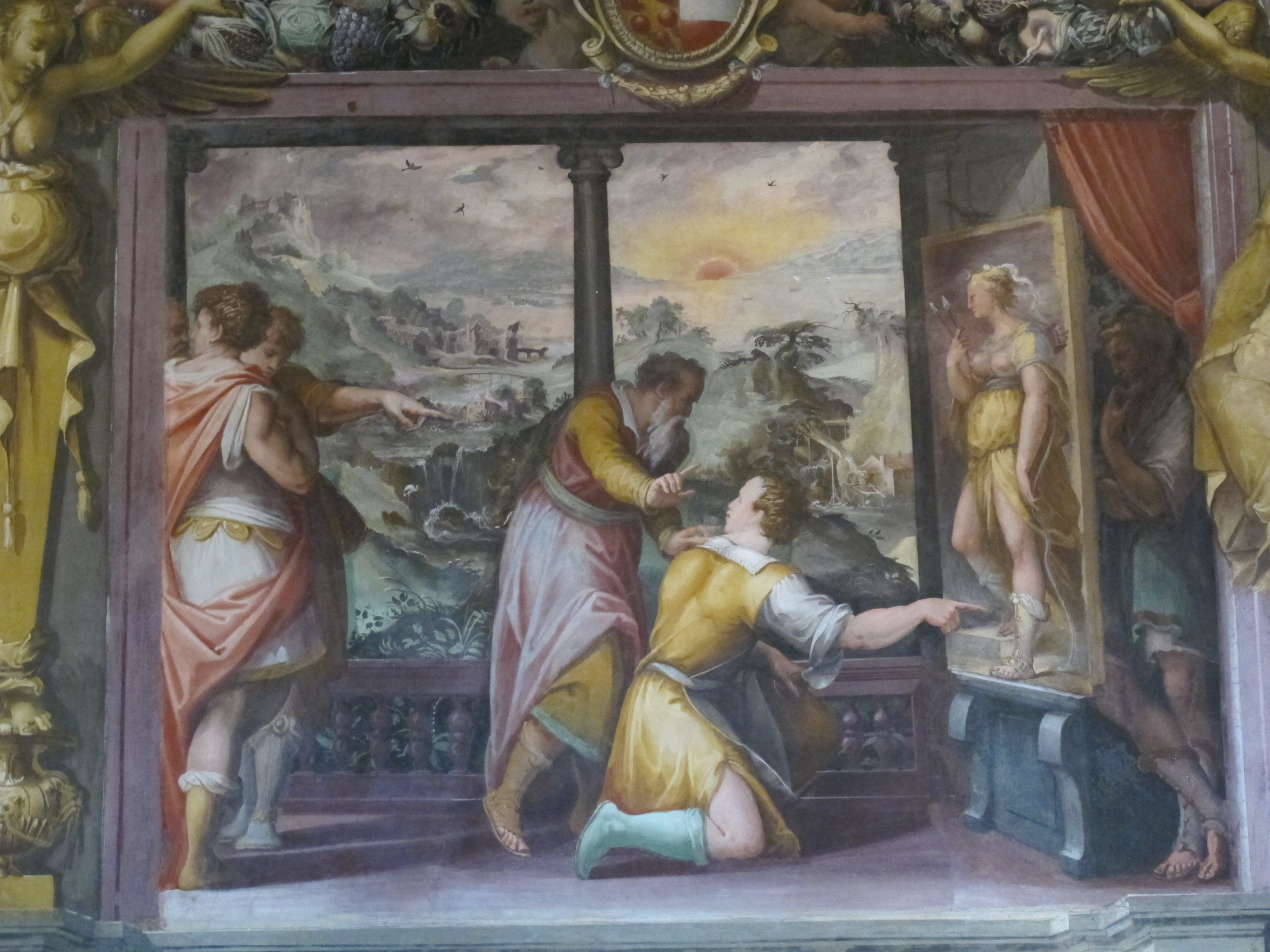
Vasari's home in Florence, Apelles

Ne supra crepidam ("not beyond the shoe") is a Latin expression used to tell others not to pass judgment beyond their expertise.

== Origin ==
The phrase is recorded in Book 35 of Pliny the Elder's Natural History as ne supra crepidam sutor iudicaret ("Let the cobbler not judge beyond the crepida") and ascribed to the Greek painter Apelles of Kos. Supposedly, Apelles would put new paintings on public display and hide behind them to hear and act on their reception. On one occasion, a shoemaker (Latin sutor) noted that one of the crepides (Note: By the Hellenistic period, the crepida (κρηπῐ́ς, krēpḯs) was considered the distinctively Greek footwear and consisted of a sole bound to the foot with a variety of straps depending on the specific style. Both the Greeks and Romans distinguished crepides from proper sandals, boots, and shoes with a closed upper but they are now usually discussed as a class of sandal.) in a painting had the wrong number of straps and was so delighted when he found the error corrected the next day that he started in on criticizing the legs. Indignant, Apelles came from his hiding place and admonished him to confine his opinions to the shoes. Pliny then states that since that time it had become proverbial.

== History ==
The expression became current again during the Renaissance, which featured intense interest in both painting and Classical Antiquity. Erasmus's Adages included the form ne sutor ultra crepidam. Richard Taverner translated this into English as "Let not the shoemaker go beyond hys shoe", which became "Cobler keepe your last" in the 1616 revised edition of John Withals's Shorte Dictionarie for Yonge Beginners and ultimately cobbler, keep to your last. The same idea is also proverbial in Danish (Skomager, bliv ved din læst), Dutch (Schoenmaker, blijf bij je leest), German (Schuster, bleib bei deinen Leisten), Hungarian (A suszter maradjon a kaptafánál), and Polish (Pilnuj, szewcze, kopyta) and—slightly modified— in Russian (Суди, дружок, не свыше сапога, "Judge not, pal, above the boot"), after Alexander Pushkin's poetic retelling of the legend, and in Spanish (Zapatero, a tus zapatos, "Shoemaker, to your shoes") and in Slovene (Le čevlje sodi naj kopitar, "let the cobbler judge the shoes only"), from France Prešeren's poem depicting the story.

Karl Marx ridiculed the idea: "'Ne sutor ultra crepidam' – this nec plus ultra of handicraft wisdom became sheer nonsense, from the moment the watchmaker Watt invented the steam-engine, the barber Arkwright the throstle, and the working-jeweller Fulton the steamship."

== Ultracrepidarian ==
An ultracrepidarian—from ultra- ("beyond") and crepidarian ("things related to shoes")—is a person considered to have ignored this advice and to be offering opinions on topics they know nothing about. It is first attested in the English essayist William Hazlitt's 1819 open "Letter to William Gifford", the editor of the Quarterly Review: "You have been well called an Ultra-Crepidarian critic." The editor of Hazlitt's writings, however, offers that it might have been coined by Charles Lamb instead. It was picked up four years later in Hazlitt's friend Leigh Hunt's 1823 satire Ultra-Crepidarius: A Satire on William Gifford. Occasionally the word ultracrepidarianism—the act or general practice of speaking beyond one's knowledge—was used similarly later.

== See also ==
- Credentialism
- Domain knowledge
- Dunning–Kruger effect
- List of Latin phrases
- Metallic Metals Act
- Nobel disease
- Subject-matter expert
