= Nobel Prize =

Prizes established by Alfred Nobel in 1895

- Awarded for: Contributions that have conferred the greatest benefit to humankind in the areas of Physics, Chemistry, Physiology or Medicine, Literature, Peace, Economics.
- Country: Sweden (all prizes except the Peace Prize); Norway (Peace Prize only)
- Presented by: Royal Swedish Academy of Sciences (Physics, Chemistry and Economics); Nobel Assembly at the Karolinska Institute (Physiology or Medicine); Swedish Academy (Literature); Norwegian Nobel Committee (Peace)
- Rewards: A gold-plated green gold medal, a diploma, and a monetary award of 12 million SEK as of 2026.
- First award: 10 December 1901; 124 years ago
- Number of laureates: 633 prizes awarded to 1,018 individuals and organizations (as of 2026)
- Website: nobelprize.org

The Nobel Prizes (Note: /noʊˈbɛl/ noh-BEL; Swedish: Nobelpriset [nʊˈbɛ̂lːˌpriːsɛt]; Norwegian: Nobelprisen [nʊˈbɛ̀lːˌpriːsn̩]) are awards administered by the Nobel Foundation and granted in accordance with the principle of "for the greatest benefit to humankind". The prizes were first awarded in 1901, marking the fifth anniversary of Alfred Nobel's death. The original Nobel Prizes covered five fields: physics, chemistry, physiology or medicine, literature, and peace, specified in Nobel's will. A sixth prize, the Prize in Economic Sciences, was established in 1968 by Sveriges Riksbank (Sweden's central bank) in memory of Alfred Nobel. The Nobel Prizes are widely regarded as the most prestigious awards available in their respective fields.

Except in unusual or special circumstances, such as war, all six prizes are given annually. Each recipient, known as a laureate, receives a green gold medal plated with 24 karat gold, a diploma, and a monetary award. As of 2023, the Nobel Prize monetary award is 11,000,000 kr, equivalent to approximately US$1,035,000. No more than three individuals may share a prize, although the Nobel Peace Prize can be awarded to organisations of more than three people. Nobel Prizes are not awarded posthumously, but if a person is awarded a prize and dies before receiving it, the prize is presented.

Between 1901 and 2026, the five Nobel Prizes and the Prize in Economic Sciences (since 1969) were awarded 633 times to 1,018 people and organisations. Five individuals and two organisations have received more than one Nobel Prize.

== History ==
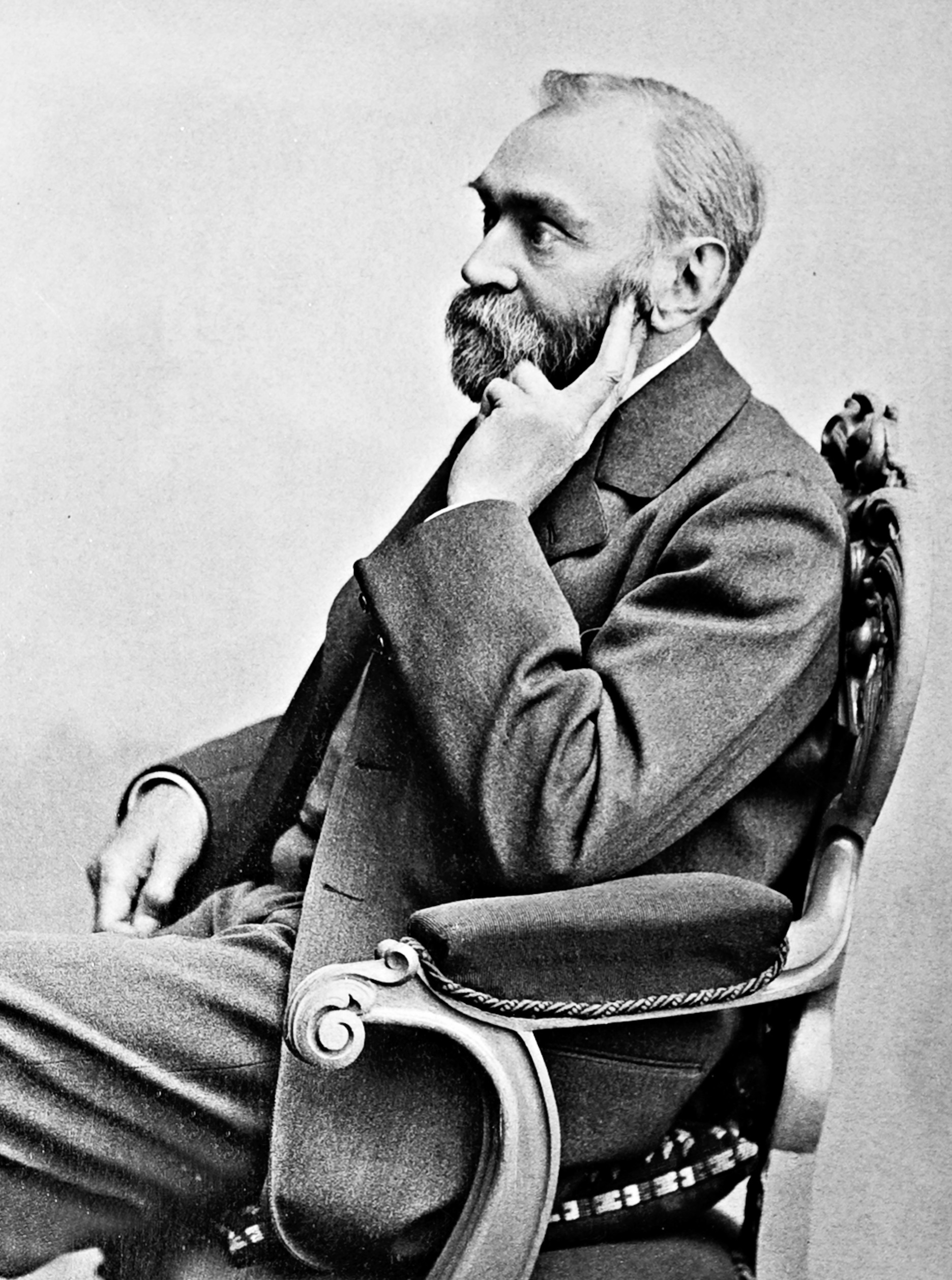
One story says that Alfred Nobel had the unpleasant surprise of reading his own obituary, which was titled "The Merchant of Death Is Dead", in a French newspaper

Alfred Nobel was born on 21 October 1833 in Stockholm, Sweden, into a family of engineers. He was a chemist, engineer, and inventor. In 1894, Nobel purchased the Bofors iron and steel mill, which he made into a major armaments manufacturer. Nobel also invented ballistite. This invention was a precursor to many smokeless military explosives, especially the British smokeless powder cordite. As a consequence of his patent claims, Nobel was eventually involved in a patent infringement lawsuit over cordite. Nobel amassed a fortune during his lifetime, with most of his wealth coming from his 355 inventions, of which dynamite is the most famous.

There is a popular story about how, in 1888, Nobel was astonished to read his own obituary, titled "The Merchant of Death Is Dead", in a French newspaper. It was Alfred's brother Ludvig who had died; the obituary was eight years premature. The article disconcerted Nobel and made him apprehensive about how he would be remembered. This would have inspired him to change his will. Historians have been unable to verify this story and some dismiss the story as a myth.

On 10 December 1896, Alfred Nobel died in his villa in San Remo, Italy, from a cerebral haemorrhage. He was 63 years old.

Nobel wrote several wills during his lifetime. He composed the last over a year before he died, signing it at the Swedish–Norwegian Club in Paris on 27 November 1895. To widespread astonishment, Nobel's last will specified that his fortune be used to create a series of prizes for those who confer the "greatest benefit on mankind" in physics, chemistry, physiology or medicine, literature, and peace. Nobel bequeathed 94% of his total assets, 31 million SEK (c. US$186 million, €150 million in 2008), to establish the five Nobel Prizes. Owing to skepticism surrounding the will, it was not approved by the Storting in Norway until 26 April 1897. The executors of the will, Ragnar Sohlman and Rudolf Lilljequist, formed the Nobel Foundation to take care of the fortune and to organise the awarding of prizes.

Nobel's instructions named a Norwegian Nobel Committee to award the Peace Prize, the members of which were appointed shortly after the will was approved in April 1897. Soon thereafter, the other prize-awarding organisations were designated. These were the Karolinska Institute on 7 June, the Swedish Academy on 9 June, and the Royal Swedish Academy of Sciences on 11 June. The Nobel Foundation reached an agreement on guidelines for how the prizes should be awarded; and, in 1900, the Nobel Foundation's newly created statutes were promulgated by King Oscar II.

=== Nobel Foundation ===
==== Formation of Nobel Foundation ====
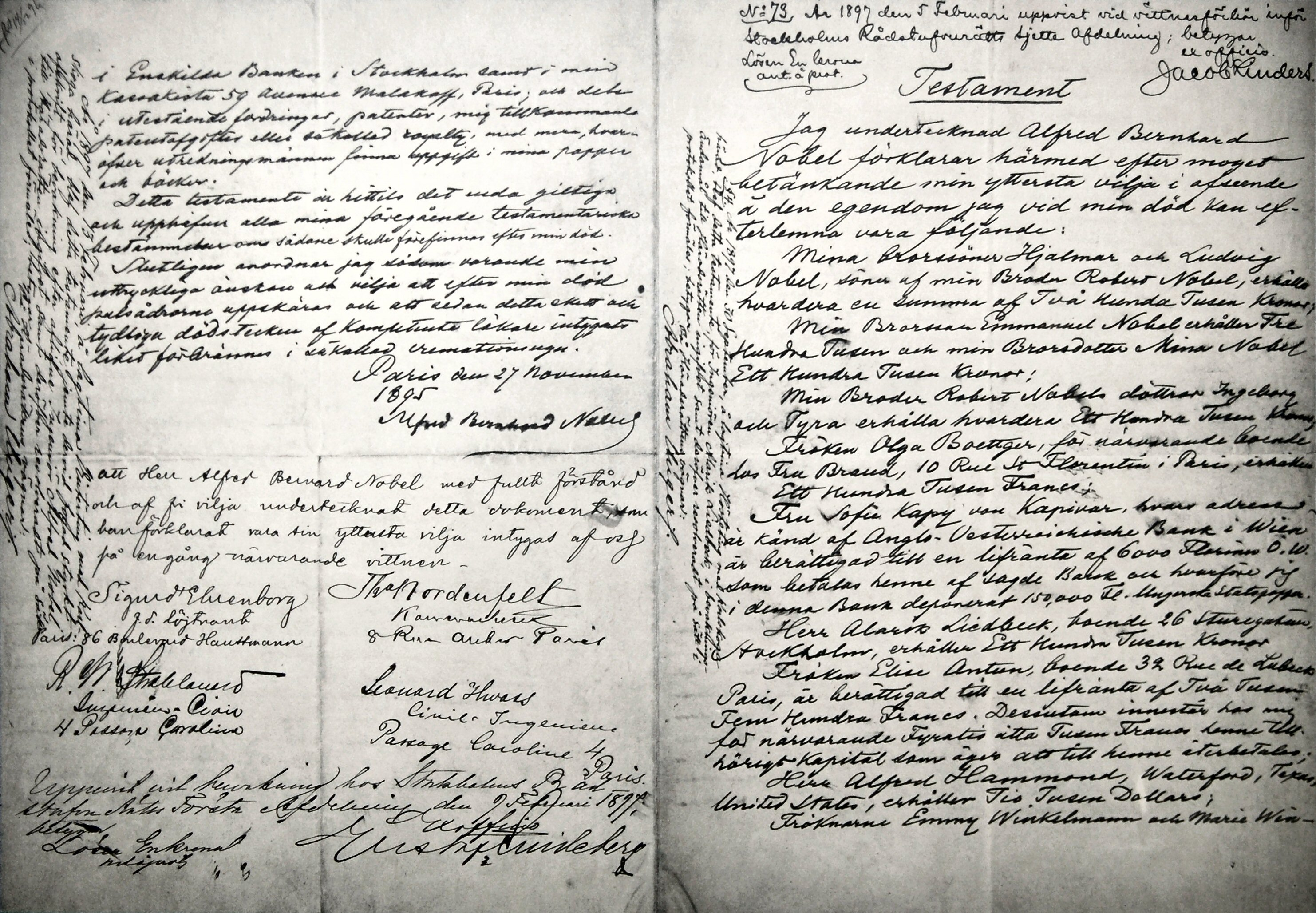
Alfred Nobel's will, which stated that 94% of his total assets should be used to establish the Nobel Prizes

According to his will and testament read in Stockholm on 30 December 1896, a foundation established by Alfred Nobel would reward those who serve humanity. The Nobel Prize was funded by Alfred Nobel's personal fortune. According to the official sources, Alfred Nobel bequeathed most of his fortune to the Nobel Foundation that now forms the economic base of the Nobel Prize.

The Nobel Foundation was founded as a private organisation on 29 June 1900. Its function is to manage the finances and administration of the Nobel Prizes. In accordance with Nobel's will, the primary task of the foundation is to manage the fortune left to posterity by Nobel. Robert and Ludvig Nobel were involved in the oil business in Azerbaijan, and according to Swedish historian E. Bargengren, who accessed the Nobel family archive, it was this "decision to allow withdrawal of Alfred's money from Baku that became the decisive factor that enabled the Nobel Prizes to be established". Another important task of the Nobel Foundation is to market the prizes internationally and to oversee informal administration related to the prizes. The foundation is not involved in the process of selecting the Nobel laureates. In many ways, the Nobel Foundation is similar to an investment company, in that it invests Nobel's money to create a solid funding base for the prizes and the administrative activities. The Nobel Foundation is exempt from all taxes in Sweden (since 1946) and from investment taxes in the United States (since 1953). Since the 1980s, the foundation's investments have become more profitable and as of 31 December 2007, the assets controlled by the Nobel Foundation amounted to 3.628 billion Swedish kronor (c. US $560 million).

According to the statutes, the foundation consists of a board of five Swedish or Norwegian citizens, with its seat in Stockholm. The chairman of the board is appointed by the Swedish King in Council, with the other four members appointed by the trustees of the prize-awarding institutions. An executive director is chosen from among the board members, a deputy director is appointed by the King in Council, and two deputies are appointed by the trustees. However, since 1995, all the members of the board have been chosen by the trustees, and the executive director and the deputy director appointed by the board itself. As well as the board, the Nobel Foundation is made up of the prize-awarding institutions (the Royal Swedish Academy of Sciences, the Nobel Assembly at Karolinska Institute, the Swedish Academy, and the Norwegian Nobel Committee), the trustees of these institutions, and auditors.

==== Foundation capital and cost ====
The capital of the Nobel Foundation today is invested 50% in shares, 20% bonds and 30% other investments (e.g. hedge funds or real estate). The distribution can vary by 10 percent. At the beginning of 2008, 64% of the funds were invested mainly in American and European stocks, 20% in bonds, plus 12% in real estate and hedge funds.

In 2011, the total annual cost was approximately 120 million kronor, with 50 million kronor as the prize money. Further costs to pay institutions and persons engaged in giving the prizes were 27.4 million kronor. The events during the Nobel week in Stockholm and Oslo cost 20.2 million kronor. The administration, Nobel symposium, and similar items had costs of 22.4 million kronor. The cost of the Economic Sciences prize of 16.5 Million kronor is paid by the Sveriges Riksbank.

=== Inaugural Nobel prizes ===
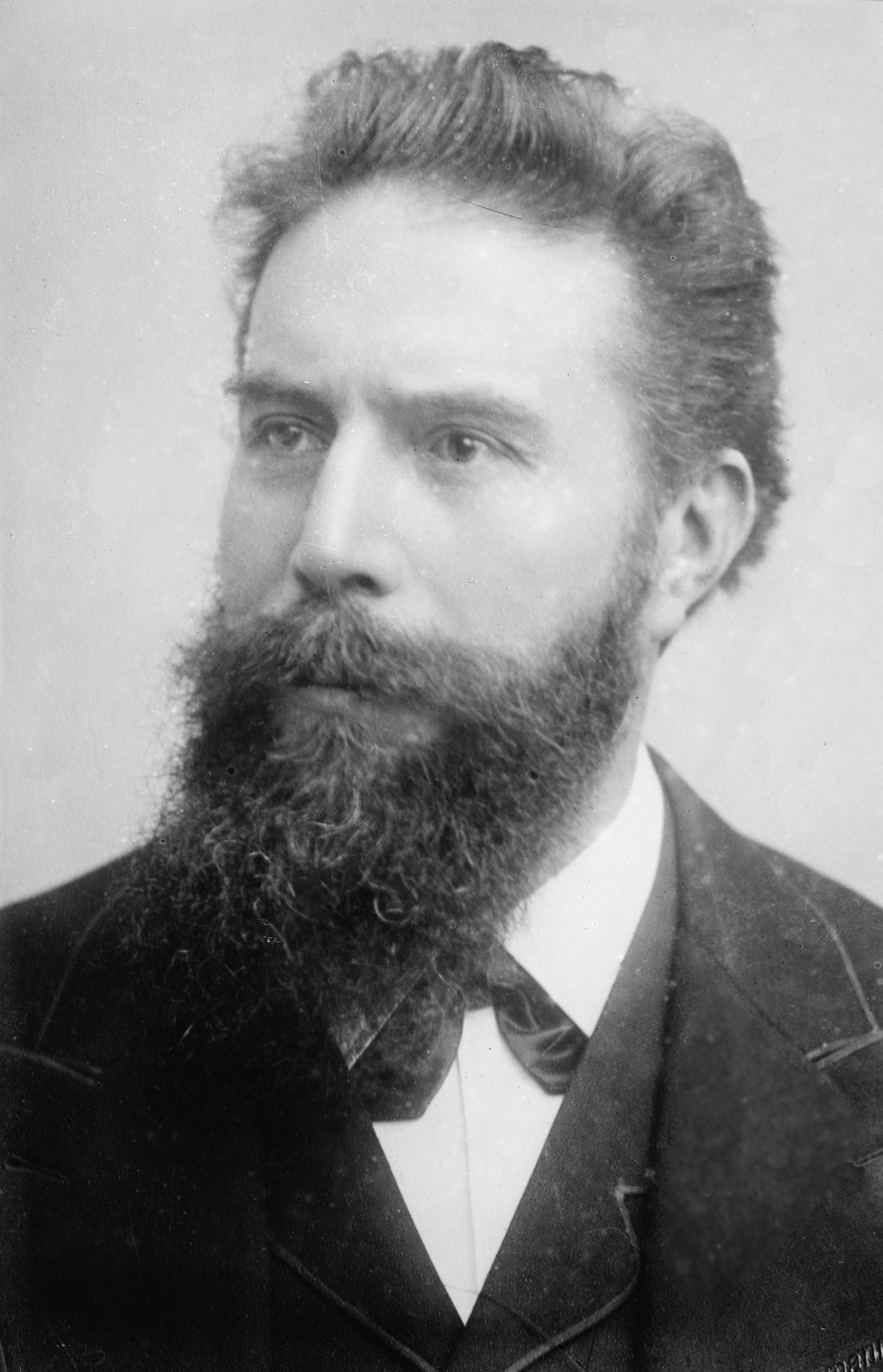
Wilhelm Röntgen, who received the first Nobel Prize in Physics for his discovery of the X-ray

Once the Nobel Foundation and its guidelines were in place, the Nobel Committees began collecting nominations for the inaugural prizes. Subsequently, they sent a list of preliminary candidates to the prize-awarding institutions.

The Nobel Committee's Physics Prize shortlist cited Wilhelm Röntgen's discovery of X-rays and Philipp Lenard's work on cathode rays. The Academy of Sciences selected Röntgen for the prize. In the last decades of the 19th century, many chemists had made significant contributions. Thus, with the Chemistry Prize, the academy "was chiefly faced with merely deciding the order in which these scientists should be awarded the prize". The academy received 20 nominations, eleven of them for Jacobus van 't Hoff. Van 't Hoff was awarded the prize for his contributions in chemical thermodynamics.

The Swedish Academy chose the poet Sully Prudhomme for the first Nobel Prize in Literature. A group including 42 Swedish writers, artists, and literary critics protested against this decision, having expected Leo Tolstoy to be awarded. Some, including Burton Feldman, have criticised this prize because they consider Prudhomme a mediocre poet. Feldman's explanation is that most of the academy members preferred Victorian literature and thus selected a Victorian poet. The first Physiology or Medicine Prize went to the German physiologist and microbiologist Emil von Behring. During the 1890s, von Behring developed an antitoxin to treat diphtheria, which until then had been causing thousands of deaths each year.

The first Nobel Peace Prize went to the Swiss Jean Henri Dunant for his role in founding the International Red Cross Movement and initiating the Geneva Convention, and jointly given to French pacifist Frédéric Passy, founder of the Peace League and active with Dunant in the Alliance for Order and Civilization.

=== Second World War ===
In 1938 and 1939, Adolf Hitler's Third Reich forbade three laureates from Germany (Richard Kuhn, Adolf Friedrich Johann Butenandt, and Gerhard Domagk) from accepting their prizes. They were all later able to receive the diploma and medal. Even though Sweden was officially neutral during the Second World War, the prizes were awarded irregularly. In 1939, the Peace Prize was not awarded. No prize was awarded in any category from 1940 to 1942, due to the occupation of Norway by Germany. In the subsequent year, all prizes were awarded except those for literature and peace.

During the occupation of Norway, three members of the Norwegian Nobel Committee fled into exile. The remaining members escaped persecution from the Germans when the Nobel Foundation stated that the committee building in Oslo was Swedish property. Thus it was a safe haven from the German military, which was not at war with Sweden. These members kept the work of the committee going, but did not award any prizes. In 1944, the Nobel Foundation, together with the three members in exile, made sure that nominations were submitted for the Peace Prize and that the prize could be awarded once again.

=== Prize in Economic Sciences ===
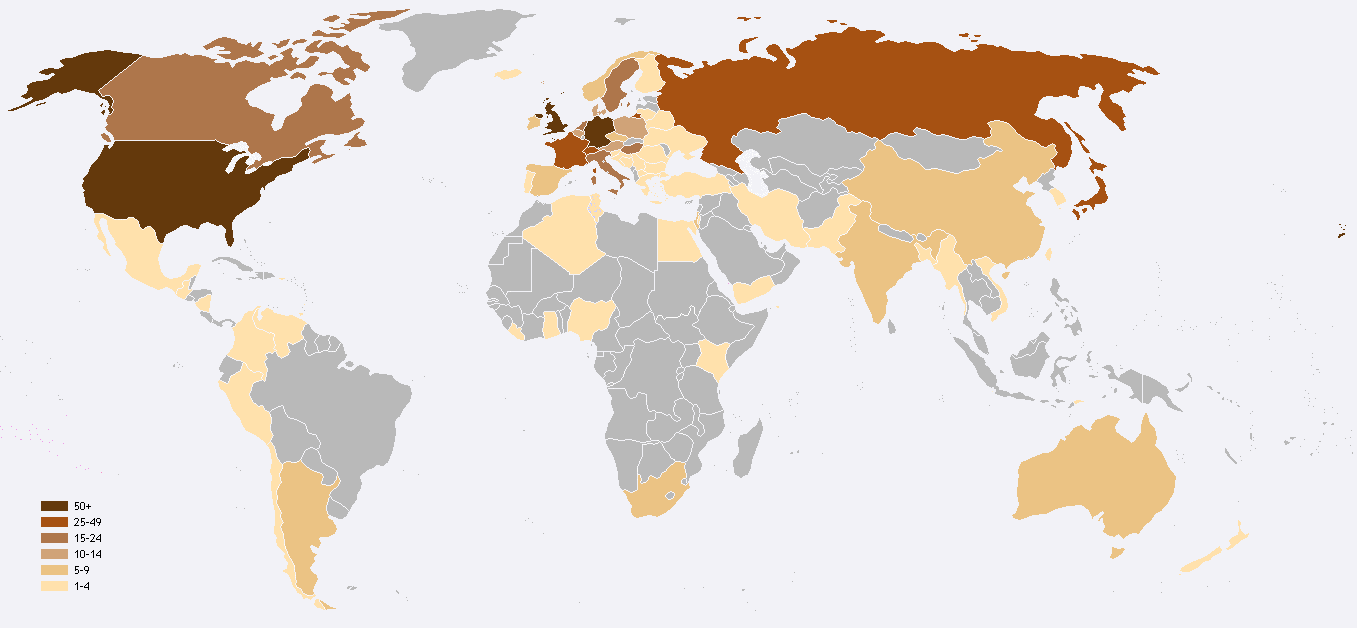
Map of Nobel laureates by country

After World War II, economics evolved rapidly as an academic discipline and came to be increasingly recognized as a significant scientific field. In 1968, Sweden's central bank, Sveriges Riksbank, celebrated its 300th anniversary and donated a sum of money to the Nobel Foundation to be used to set up a new award in the field of economic sciences. The following year, 1969, the Prize in Economic Sciences was awarded for the first time. The Royal Swedish Academy of Sciences is required to select the economics laureate in the same way as it does for the science Nobel Prizes. The first laureates for the Economics Prize were Jan Tinbergen and Ragnar Frisch, "for having developed and applied dynamic models for the analysis of economic processes". The board of the Nobel Foundation decided that after this addition, it would allow no further new prizes.

== Award process ==
The award process is similar for all of the Nobel Prizes, the main difference being who can make nominations for each of them.

The 2009 announcement of the laureates in Nobel Prize in Chemistry by Gunnar Öquist, permanent secretary of the Royal Swedish Academy of Sciences

The 2009 Nobel Prize in Literature announcement by Peter Englund in Swedish, English, and German

=== Nominations ===
Nomination forms are sent by the Nobel Committee to about 3,000 individuals, usually in September the year before the prizes are awarded. These individuals are generally prominent academics working in a relevant area. Regarding the Peace Prize, inquiries are also sent to governments, former Peace Prize laureates, and current or former members of the Norwegian Nobel Committee. The deadline for the return of the nomination forms is 31 January of the year of the award. The Nobel Committee nominates about 300 potential laureates from these forms and additional names. The nominees are not publicly named, nor are they told that they are being considered for the prize. All nomination records for a prize are sealed for 50 years from the awarding of the prize.

=== Selection ===
The Nobel Committee then prepares a report reflecting the advice of experts in the relevant fields. This, along with the list of preliminary candidates, is submitted to the prize-awarding institutions. There are four awarding institutions for the six prizes awarded:

- Royal Swedish Academy of Sciences – Chemistry; Physics; Economics
- Nobel Assembly at the Karolinska Institute – Physiology / Medicine
- Swedish Academy – Literature
- Norwegian Nobel Committee – Peace

The institutions meet to choose the laureate or laureates in each field by a majority vote. Their decision, which cannot be appealed, is announced immediately after the vote. A maximum of three laureates and two different works may be selected per award. Except for the Peace Prize, which can be awarded to institutions, the awards can only be given to individuals. The winners are announced by the awarding institutions during the first two weeks of October.

=== Posthumous nominations ===
Although posthumous nominations are not presently permitted, individuals who died in the months between their nomination and the decision of the prize committee were originally eligible to receive the prize. This has occurred twice: the 1931 Literature Prize awarded to Erik Axel Karlfeldt, and the 1961 Peace Prize awarded to UN Secretary General Dag Hammarskjöld. Since 1974, laureates must be thought alive at the time of the October announcement. There has been one laureate, William Vickrey, who in 1996 died after the prize (in Economics) was announced but before it could be presented. On 3 October 2011, the laureates for the Nobel Prize in Physiology or Medicine were announced; however, the committee was not aware that one of the laureates, Ralph M. Steinman, had died three days earlier. The committee reconsidered Steinman's award, since the rule is that the prize is not awarded posthumously, but decided that as the decision to award Steinman the prize "was made in good faith", it would remain unchanged, and the prize would be awarded.

=== Recognition time lag ===
Nobel's will provided for prizes to be awarded in recognition of discoveries made "during the preceding year". Early on, the awards usually recognised recent discoveries. However, some of those early discoveries were later discredited. For example, Johannes Fibiger was awarded the 1926 Prize in Physiology or Medicine for his purported discovery of a parasite that caused cancer. To avoid repeating this embarrassment, the awards increasingly recognised scientific discoveries that had withstood the test of time. According to Ralf Pettersson, former chairman of the Nobel Prize Committee for Physiology or Medicine, "the criterion 'the previous year' is interpreted by the Nobel Assembly as the year when the full impact of the discovery has become evident."

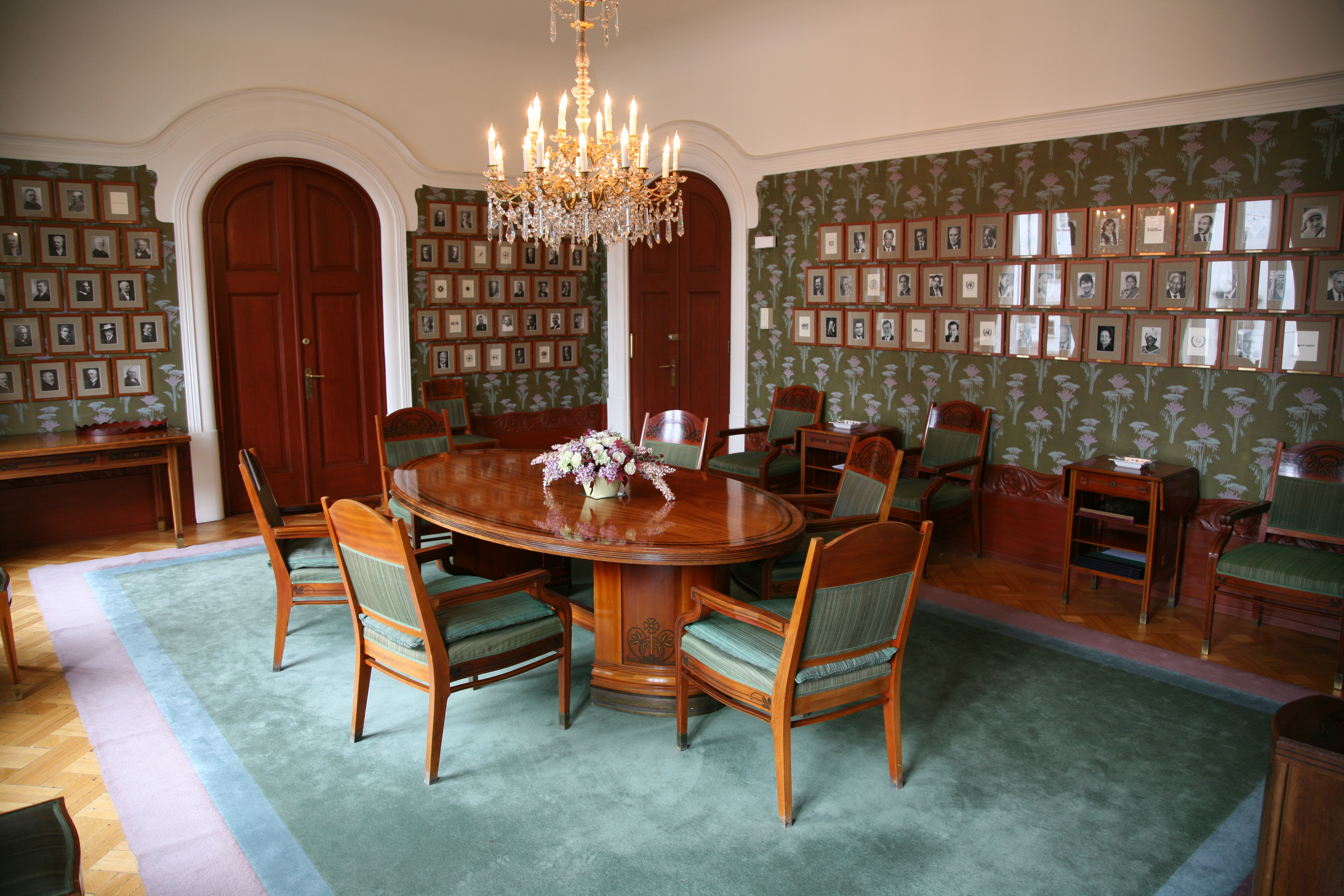
The committee room of the Norwegian Nobel Committee

The interval between the award and the accomplishment it recognises varies from discipline to discipline. The Literature Prize is typically awarded to recognise a cumulative lifetime body of work rather than a single achievement. The Peace Prize can also be awarded for a lifetime body of work. For example, 2008 laureate Martti Ahtisaari was awarded for his work to resolve international conflicts. However, they can also be awarded for specific recent events. For instance, Kofi Annan was awarded the 2001 Peace Prize just four years after becoming the Secretary-General of the United Nations. Similarly Yasser Arafat, Yitzhak Rabin, and Shimon Peres received the 1994 award, about a year after they successfully concluded the Oslo Accords. A controversy was caused by awarding the 2009 Nobel Peace Prize to Barack Obama during his first year as US president.

Awards for physics, chemistry, and medicine are typically awarded once the achievement has been widely accepted. Sometimes, this takes decades – for example, Subrahmanyan Chandrasekhar shared the 1983 Physics Prize for his 1930s work on stellar structure and evolution. Not all scientists live long enough for their work to be recognised. Some discoveries can never be considered for a prize if their impact is realised after the discoverers have died.

== Award ceremonies and related events ==
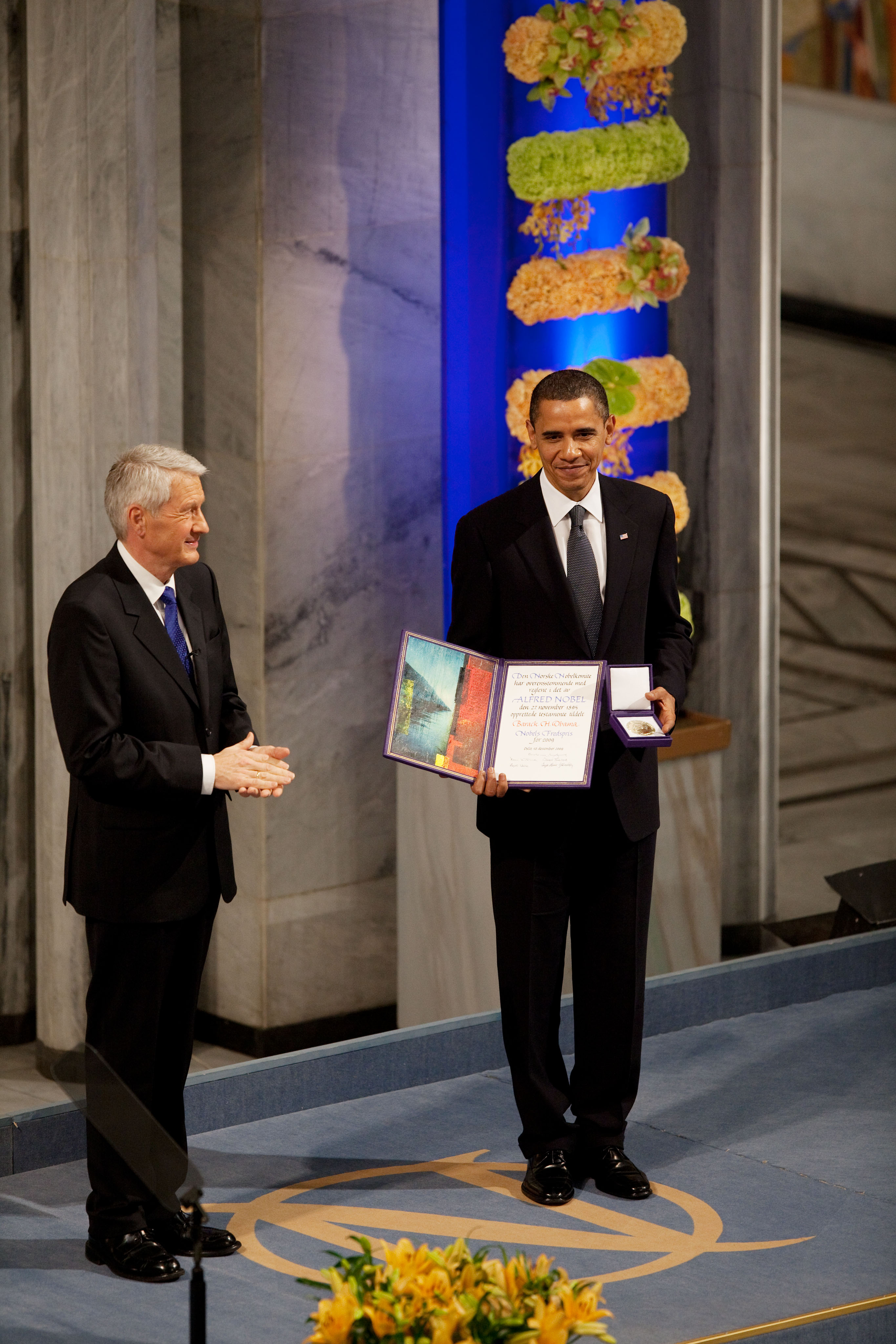
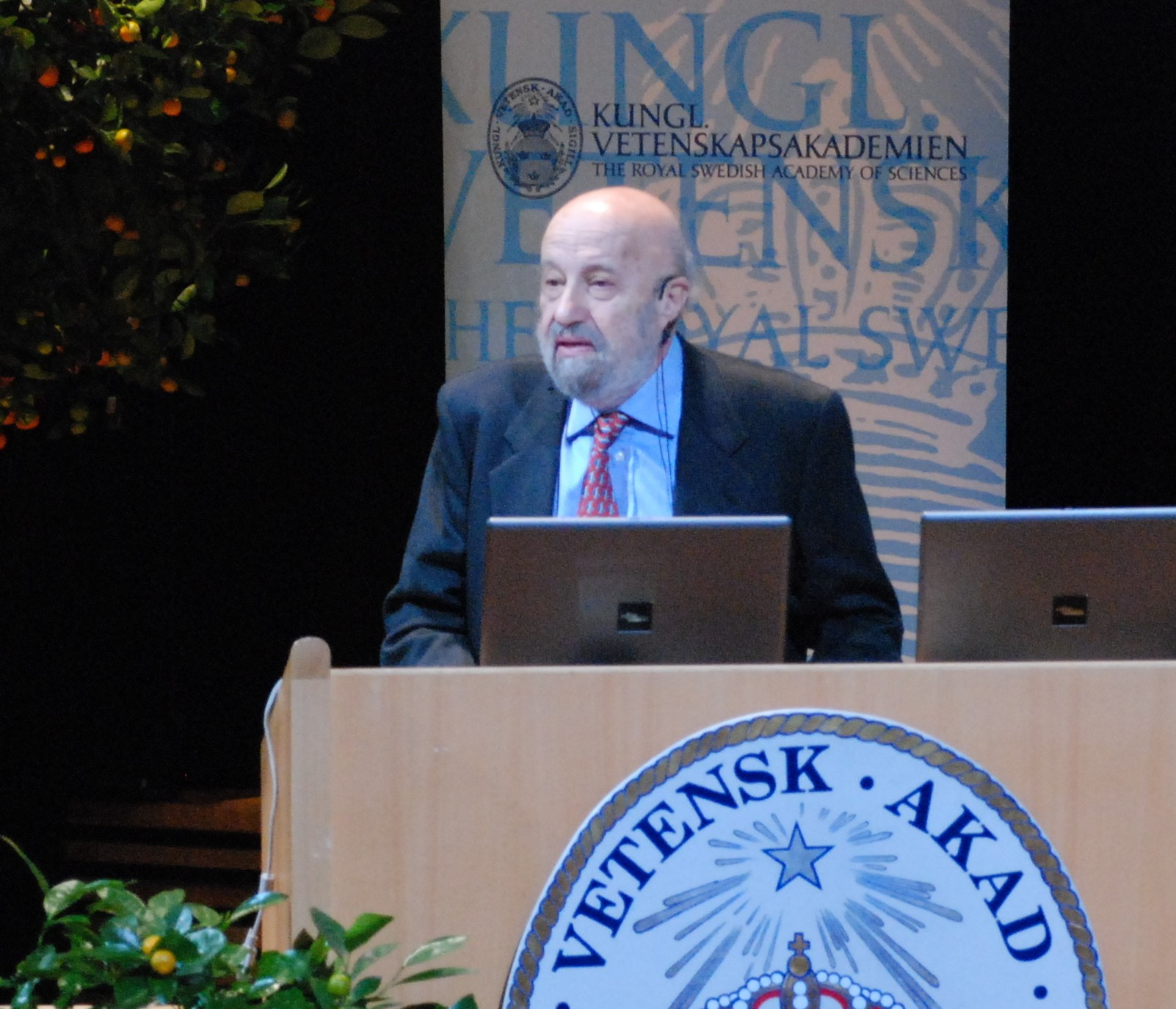
Right: Giovanni Jona-Lasinio presenting Yoichiro Nambu's Nobel Lecture at Aula Magna in Stockholm in 2008; Left: Barack Obama after receiving the Nobel Peace Prize in Oslo City Hall from Norwegian Nobel Committee chairman Thorbjørn Jagland in 2009

Except for the Peace Prize, the Nobel Prizes are presented in Stockholm, Sweden, at the annual Prize Award Ceremony on 10 December, the anniversary of Nobel's death. The recipients' lectures are normally held in the days prior to the award ceremony. The Peace Prize and its recipients' lectures are presented at the annual Prize Award Ceremony in Oslo, Norway, usually on 10 December. The award ceremonies and the associated banquets are typically major international events. The Prizes awarded in Sweden's ceremonies are held at the Stockholm Concert Hall, with the Nobel banquet following immediately at Stockholm City Hall. The Nobel Peace Prize ceremony has been held at the Norwegian Nobel Institute (1905–1946), at the auditorium of the University of Oslo (1947–1989), and at Oslo City Hall (1990–present).

The highlight of the Nobel Prize Award Ceremony in Stockholm occurs when each Nobel laureate steps forward to receive the prize from the hands of the King of Sweden. In Oslo, the chairman of the Norwegian Nobel Committee presents the Nobel Peace Prize in the presence of the King of Norway and the Norwegian royal family. At first, King Oscar II did not approve of awarding grand prizes to foreigners.

=== Nobel Banquet ===
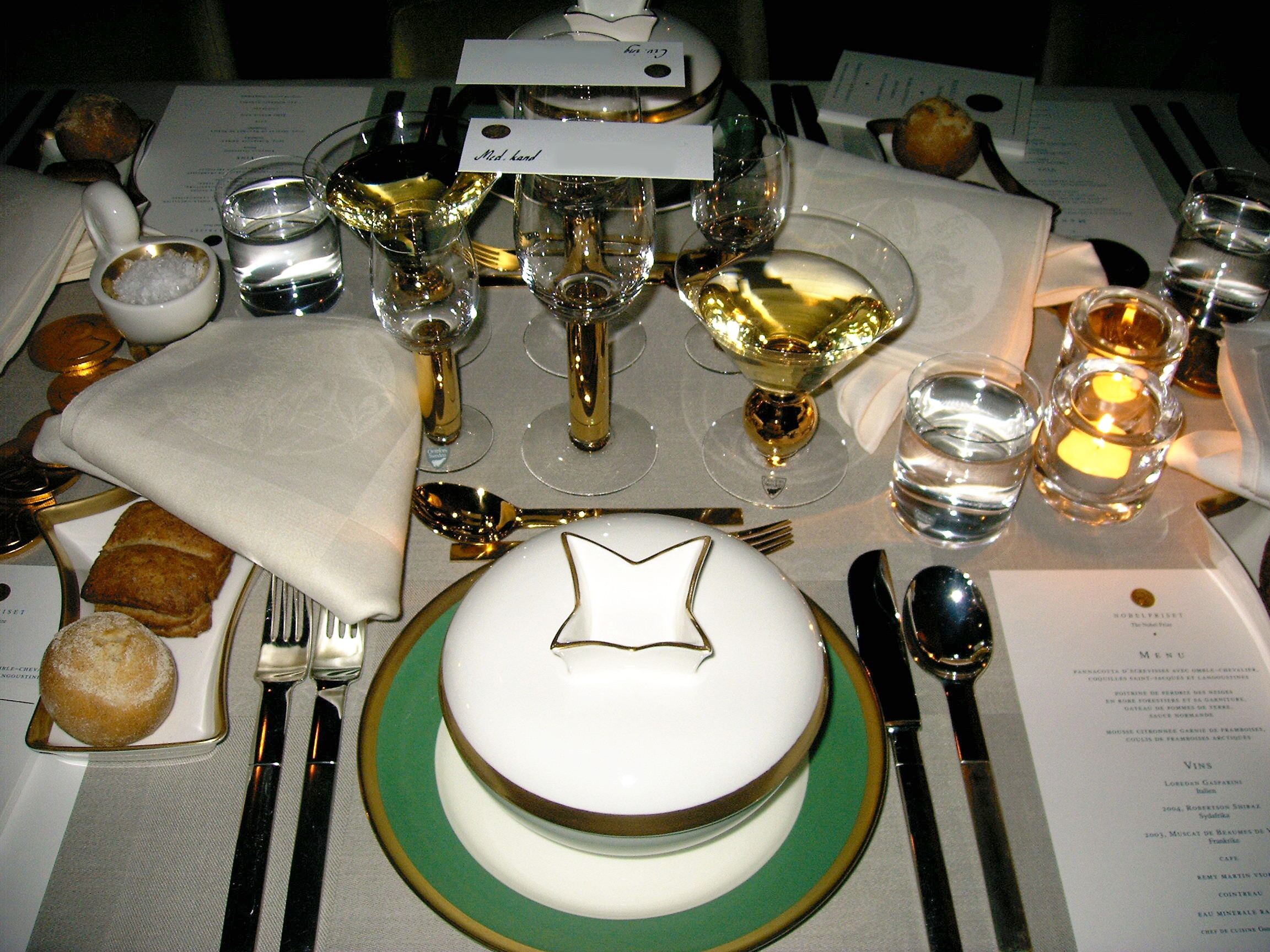
Table at the 2005 Nobel Banquet in Stockholm

After the award ceremony in Sweden, a banquet is held in the Blue Hall at the Stockholm City Hall, which is attended by the Swedish Royal Family and around 1,300 guests. The Nobel Peace Prize banquet is held in Norway at the Oslo Grand Hotel after the award ceremony. Apart from the laureate, guests include the president of the Storting, on occasion the Swedish prime minister, and, since 2006, the King and Queen of Norway. In total, about 250 guests attend.

=== Nobel lecture ===
According to the statutes of the Nobel Foundation, each laureate is required to give a public lecture on a subject related to the topic of their prize. The Nobel lecture as a rhetorical genre took decades to reach its current format. These lectures normally occur during Nobel Week (the week leading up to the award ceremony and banquet, which begins with the laureates arriving in Stockholm and normally ends with the Nobel banquet), but this is not mandatory. The laureate is only obliged to give the lecture within six months of receiving the prize, but some have happened even later. For example, US President Theodore Roosevelt received the Peace Prize in 1906 but gave his lecture in 1910, after his term in office. The lectures are organised by the same association which selected the laureates.

Military cemeteries in every corner of the world are silent testimony to the failure of national leaders to sanctify human life.

— Yitzhak Rabin, 1994 Nobel Peace Prize lecture

=== Nobel Minds ===
From 1959 to 1990, Swedish journalist Bengt Feldreich gathered the science prize laureates to a discussion, broadcast as Snillen spekulerar (in English Science and Man) first in radio, and then from the mid-1960s in Sveriges Television. Since 2004, the program is a coproduction with BBC World News under the title Nobel Minds, since 2011 hosted by Zeinab Badawi.

== Prizes ==
=== Medals ===
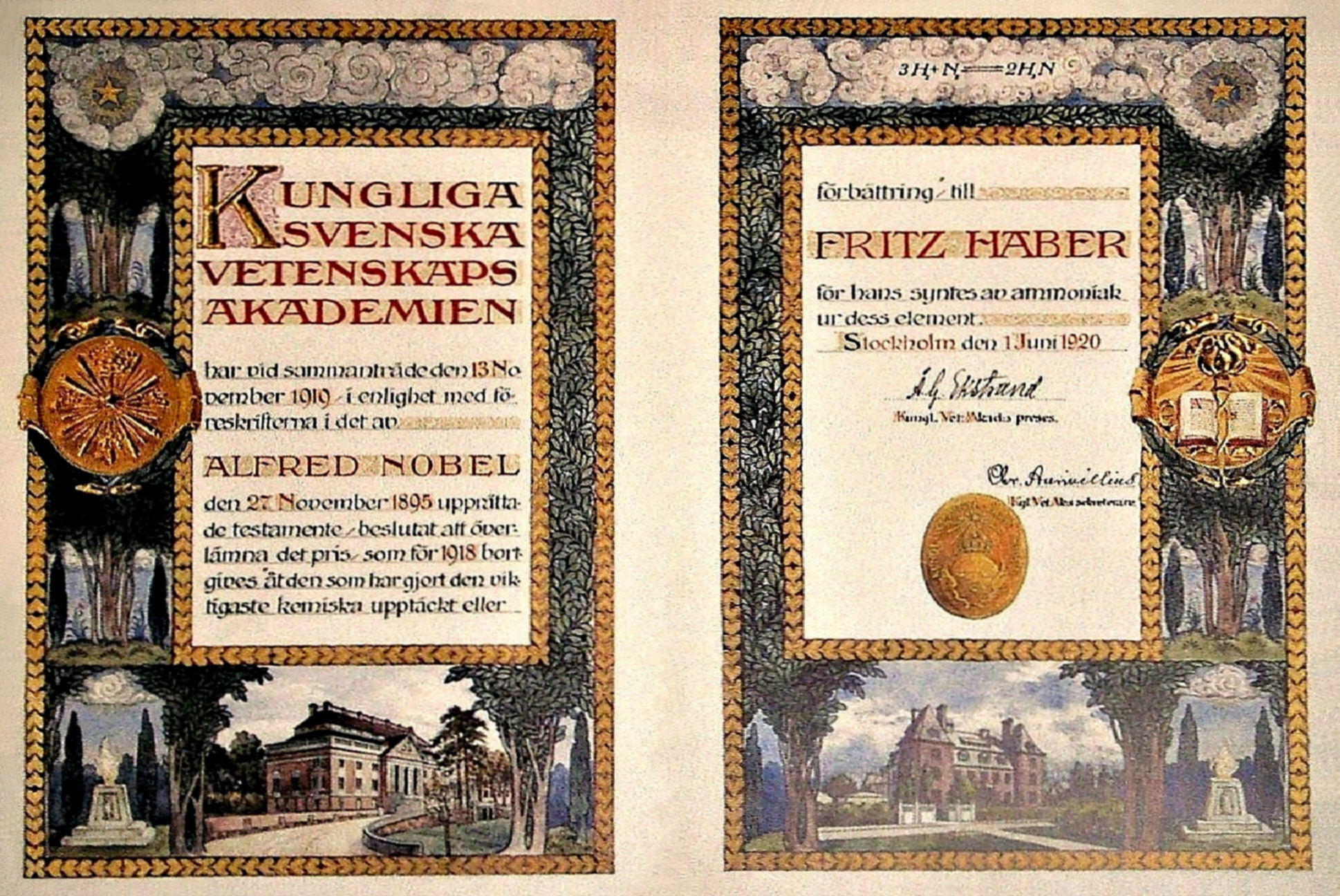
Fritz Haber's diploma is shown, which he received for the development of a method to synthesise ammonia. Laureates receive a heavily decorated diploma together with a gold medal and prize money

The Nobel Foundation announced on 30 May 2012 that it had awarded the contract for the production of the five (Swedish) Nobel Prize medals to Svenska Medalj AB. Between 1902 and 2010, the Nobel Prize medals were minted by Myntverket (the Swedish Mint), which ceased operations in 2011 after 107 years. In 2011, the Mint of Norway, located in Kongsberg, made the medals. The Nobel Prize medals are registered trademarks of the Nobel Foundation.

Each medal features an image of Alfred Nobel in left profile on the obverse. The medals for physics, chemistry, physiology or medicine, and literature have identical obverses, showing the image of Alfred Nobel and the years of his birth and death. Nobel's portrait also appears on the obverse of the Peace Prize medal and the medal for the Economics Prize, but with a slightly different design. For instance, the laureate's name is engraved on the rim of the Economics medal. The image on the reverse of a medal varies according to the institution awarding the prize. The reverse sides of the medals for chemistry and physics share the same design.

All medals made before 1980 were struck in 23 carat gold. Since then, they have been struck in 18 carat green gold plated with 24 carat gold. The weight of each medal varies with the value of gold, but averages about 175 grams (0.386 lb) for each medal. The diameter is 66 millimetres (2.6 in) and the thickness varies between 5.2 millimetres (0.20 in) and 2.4 millimetres (0.094 in). Because of the high value of their gold content and tendency to be on public display, Nobel medals are subject to medal theft. During World War II, the medals of German scientists Max von Laue and James Franck were sent to Copenhagen for safekeeping. When Germany invaded Denmark, Hungarian chemist (and Nobel laureate himself) George de Hevesy dissolved them in aqua regia (nitro-hydrochloric acid), to prevent confiscation by Nazi Germany and to prevent legal problems for the holders. After the war, the gold was recovered from solution, and the medals re-cast.

=== Diplomas ===
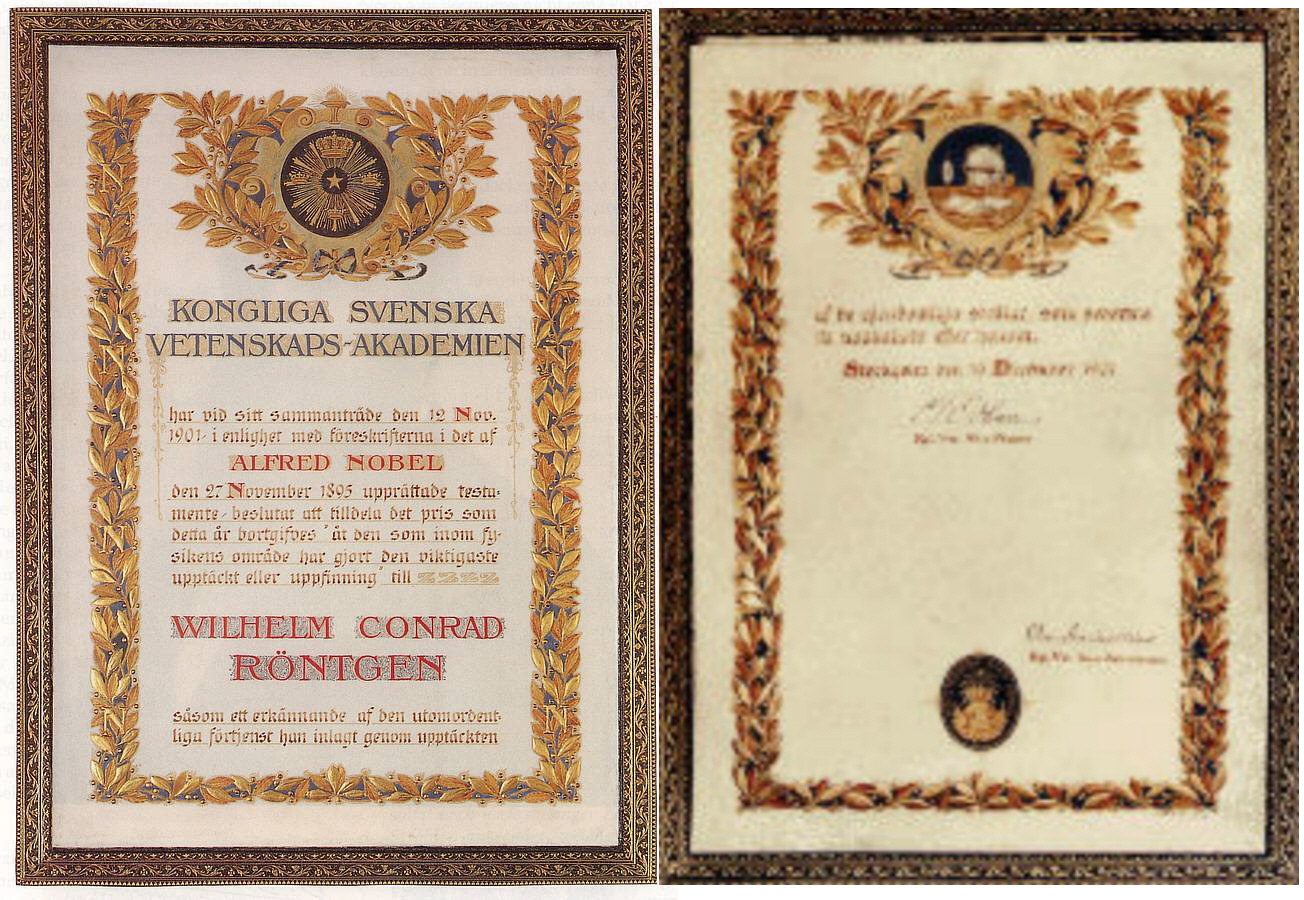
The Nobel diploma awarded to Wilhelm Conrad Röntgen in 1901

Nobel laureates receive a diploma directly from the hands of the King of Sweden, or in the case of the peace prize, the chairman of the Norwegian Nobel Committee. Each diploma is uniquely designed by the prize-awarding institutions for the laureates that receive them. The diploma contains a picture and text in Swedish which states the name of the laureate and normally a citation of why they received the prize. None of the Nobel Peace Prize laureates has ever had a citation on their diplomas.

=== Award money ===
Evolution of the prize amount between 1901 and 2023, adjusted for inflation

The laureates are given a sum of money when they receive their prizes, in the form of a document confirming the amount awarded. The amount of prize money depends upon how much money the Nobel Foundation can award each year. The purse has increased since the 1980s, when the prize money was 880,000 SEK per prize (c. 2.6 million SEK altogether, US$350,000 today). In 2009, the monetary award was 10 million SEK (US$1.4 million). In June 2012, it was lowered to 8 million SEK. If two laureates share the prize in a category, the award grant is divided equally between the recipients. If there are three, the awarding committee has the option of dividing the grant equally, or awarding one-half to one recipient and one-quarter to each of the others. It is common for recipients to donate prize money to benefit scientific, cultural, or humanitarian causes. As of 2026, the monetary award per prize category is 12 million SEK, equivalent to approximately US$1.212 million.

== Statistics ==
- Youngest person to receive a Nobel Prize:
  Malala Yousafzai; at the age of 17, received Nobel Peace Prize (2014).
- Oldest person to receive a Nobel Prize:
  John B. Goodenough; at the age of 97, received Nobel Prize in Chemistry (2019).
- Only person to receive more than one unshared Nobel Prize:
  Linus Pauling; received the prize twice. Nobel Prize in Chemistry (1954) and Nobel Peace Prize (1962).
- Persons to receive a Nobel Prize in two different disciplines:
  Marie Skłodowska-Curie; received the prize twice. Nobel Prize in Physics (1903) and Nobel Prize in Chemistry (1911).
  Linus Pauling; received the prize twice. Nobel Prize in Chemistry (1954) and Nobel Peace Prize (1962).
- Country with most Nobel laureates:

United States; 427 Nobel laureates, as of 2026.

- Laureates who have received multiple Nobel Prizes: (by date of second Prize)
  1. Marie Skłodowska-Curie; received the prize twice. Nobel Prize in Physics (1903) and Nobel Prize in Chemistry (1911).
  2. International Committee of the Red Cross; received the prize thrice (the only person or entity to have receive more than two Nobel Prizes). Nobel Peace Prize (1917, 1944, 1963).
  3. Linus Pauling; received the prize twice. Nobel Prize in Chemistry (1954) and Nobel Peace Prize (1962).
  4. John Bardeen; received the prize twice. Nobel Prize in Physics (1956, 1972).
  5. Frederick Sanger; received the prize twice. Nobel Prize in Chemistry (1958, 1980).
  6. United Nations High Commissioner for Refugees; received the prize twice. Nobel Peace Prize (1954, 1981).
  7. Karl Barry Sharpless; received the prize twice. Nobel Prize in Chemistry (2001, 2022).
- Posthumous Nobel Prizes laureates:
  1. Erik Axel Karlfeldt; received Nobel Prize in Literature (1931).
  2. Dag Hammarskjöld; received Nobel Peace Prize (1961).
  3. Ralph M. Steinman; received Nobel Prize in Physiology or Medicine (2011).
- Married couples to receive Nobel Prizes:

1. Marie Skłodowska-Curie, Pierre Curie (along with Henri Becquerel). Received Nobel Prize in Physics (1903).
2. Irène Joliot-Curie, Frédéric Joliot. Received Nobel Prize in Chemistry (1935).
3. Gerty Cori, Carl Cori. Received Nobel Prize in Medicine (1947).
4. Gunnar Myrdal received Nobel Memorial Prize in Economics Sciences (1974), Alva Myrdal received Nobel Peace Prize (1982).
5. May-Britt Moser, Edvard I. Moser. Received Nobel Prize in Medicine (2014).
6. Esther Duflo, Abhijit Banerjee (along with Michael Kremer). Received Nobel Memorial Prize in Economics Sciences (2019).

- Years without prizes:

- Physics: 1916, 1931, 1934, 1940, 1941, 1942

- Chemistry: 1916, 1917, 1919, 1924, 1933, 1940, 1941, 1942

- Physiology or Medicine: 1915, 1916, 1917, 1918, 1921, 1925, 1940, 1941, 1942

- Literature: 1914, 1918, 1935, 1940, 1941, 1942, 1943

- Peace: 1914, 1915, 1916, 1918, 1923, 1924, 1928, 1932, 1939, 1940, 1941, 1942, 1943, 1948, 1955, 1956, 1966, 1967, 1972

== Specially distinguished laureates ==
=== Multiple laureates ===
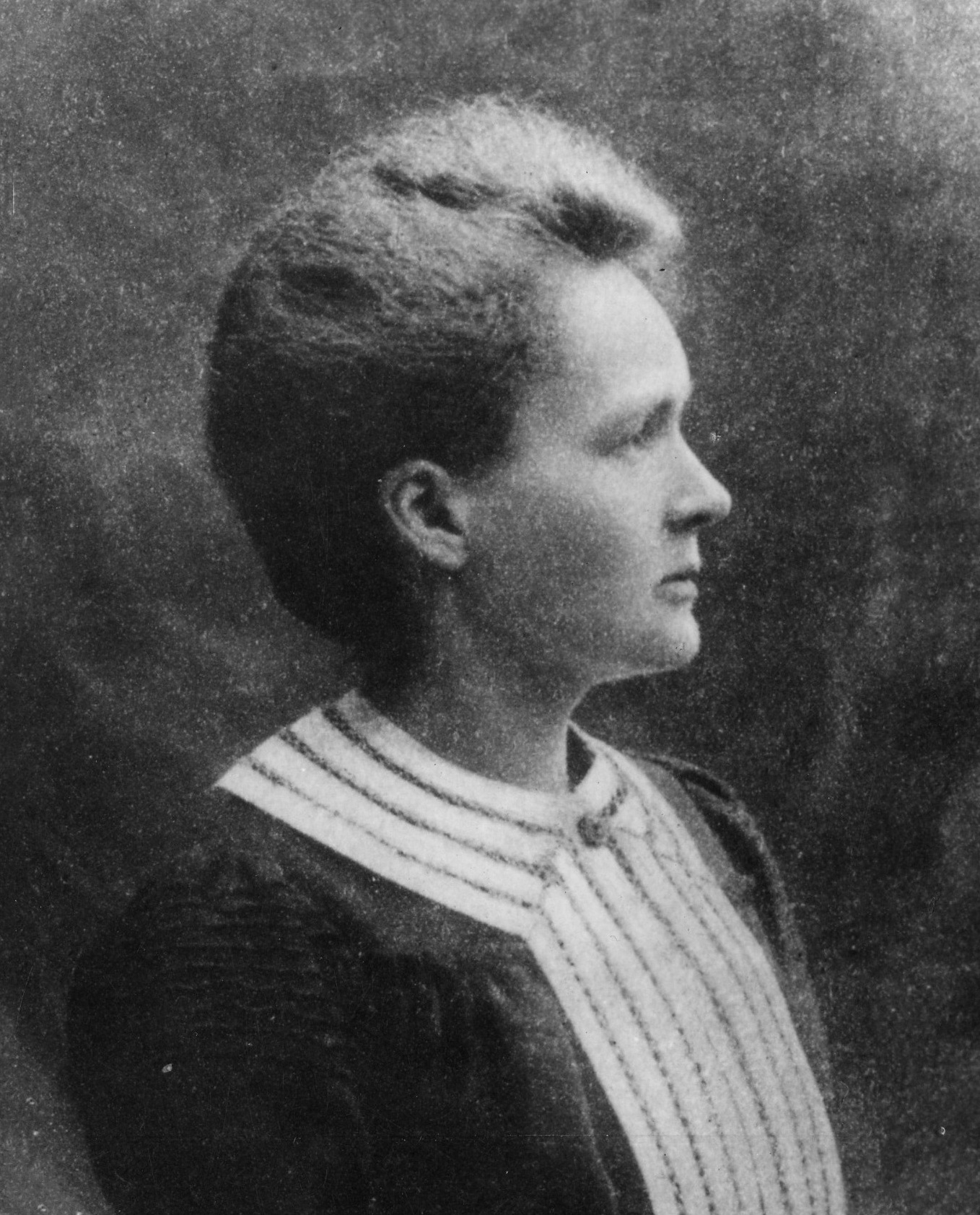
Marie Skłodowska-Curie, one of five people who have received the Nobel Prize twice (Physics and Chemistry)

Five people have received two Nobel Prizes. Marie Skłodowska-Curie received the Physics Prize in 1903 for her work on radioactivity and the Chemistry Prize in 1911 for the isolation of pure radium, making her the only person to be awarded a Nobel Prize in two different sciences. Linus Pauling was awarded the 1954 Chemistry Prize for his research into the chemical bond and its application to the structure of complex substances. Pauling was also awarded the Peace Prize in 1962 for his activism against nuclear weapons, making him the only laureate of two unshared prizes. John Bardeen received the Physics Prize twice: in 1956 for the invention of the transistor and in 1972 for the theory of superconductivity. Frederick Sanger received the prize twice in Chemistry: in 1958 for determining the structure of the insulin molecule and in 1980 for inventing a method of determining base sequences in DNA. Karl Barry Sharpless was awarded the 2001 Chemistry Prize for his research into chirally catalysed oxidation reactions, and the 2022 Chemistry Prize for click chemistry.

Two organisations have received the Peace Prize multiple times. The International Committee of the Red Cross received it three times: in 1917 and 1944 for its work during the world wars; and in 1963 during the year of its centenary. The United Nations High Commissioner for Refugees has been awarded the Peace Prize twice for assisting refugees: in 1954 and 1981.

=== Family laureates ===
The Curie family has received the most prizes, with four prizes awarded to five individual laureates. Marie Skłodowska-Curie received the prizes in Physics (in 1903) and Chemistry (in 1911). Her husband, Pierre Curie, shared the 1903 Physics prize with her. Their daughter, Irène Joliot-Curie, received the Chemistry Prize in 1935 together with her husband Frédéric Joliot-Curie. In addition, Henry Labouisse, the husband of Marie and Pierre Curie's second daughter Ève Curie, was the director of UNICEF when he accepted the Nobel Peace Prize in 1965 on that organisation's behalf.

Although no family matches the Curie family's record, there have been multiple with two laureates. The Nobel Prize in Physiology or Medicine was awarded to the husband-and-wife team of Gerty Cori and Carl Ferdinand Cori in 1947, and to the husband-and-wife team of May-Britt Moser and Edvard Moser in 2014 (along with John O'Keefe). The Physics Prize in 1906 was won by J. J. Thomson for showing that electrons are particles, and in 1937 by his son, George Paget Thomson, for showing that they also have the properties of waves. William Henry Bragg and his son, William Lawrence Bragg, shared the Physics Prize in 1915 for inventing X-ray crystallography. Niels Bohr was awarded the Physics Prize in 1922, as was his son, Aage Bohr, in 1975. The Physics Prize was awarded to Manne Siegbahn in 1924, followed by his son, Kai Siegbahn, in 1981. Hans von Euler-Chelpin, who received the Chemistry Prize in 1929, was the father of Ulf von Euler, who was awarded the Physiology or Medicine Prize in 1970. C. V. Raman was awarded the Physics Prize in 1930 and was the uncle of Subrahmanyan Chandrasekhar, who was awarded the same prize in 1983. Arthur Kornberg received the Physiology or Medicine Prize in 1959; Kornberg's son Roger later received the Chemistry Prize in 2006. Arthur Schawlow received the 1981 Physics prize, and was married to the sister of 1964 Physics laureate Charles Townes. Two members of the Hodgkin family received Nobels in consecutive years: Sir Alan Lloyd Hodgkin shared in the Nobel for Physiology or Medicine in 1963, followed by Dorothy Crowfoot Hodgkin, the wife of his first cousin, who won solo for Chemistry in 1964. Jan Tinbergen, who was awarded the first Economics Prize in 1969, was the brother of Nikolaas Tinbergen, who received the 1973 Physiology or Medicine Prize. Gunnar Myrdal, who was awarded the Economics Prize in 1974, was the husband of Alva Myrdal, Peace Prize laureate in 1982. Economics laureates Paul Samuelson (1970) and Kenneth Arrow (1972; shared) were brothers-in-law. Frits Zernike, who was awarded the 1953 Physics Prize, was the great-uncle of 1999 Physics laureate Gerard 't Hooft. In 2019, married couple Abhijit Banerjee and Esther Duflo were awarded the Economics Prize. Christiane Nüsslein-Volhard was awarded the Prize in Physiology or Medicine in 1995, and her nephew Benjamin List received the Chemistry Prize in 2021. Sune Bergström was awarded the Prize in Physiology or Medicine in 1982, and his son Svante Pääbo was awarded the same prize in 2022. Edwin McMillan, who shared the Prize in Chemistry in 1951, was the uncle of John Clauser, who was awarded the Prize in Physics in 2022.

== Reception and controversies ==
=== Controversial recipients ===
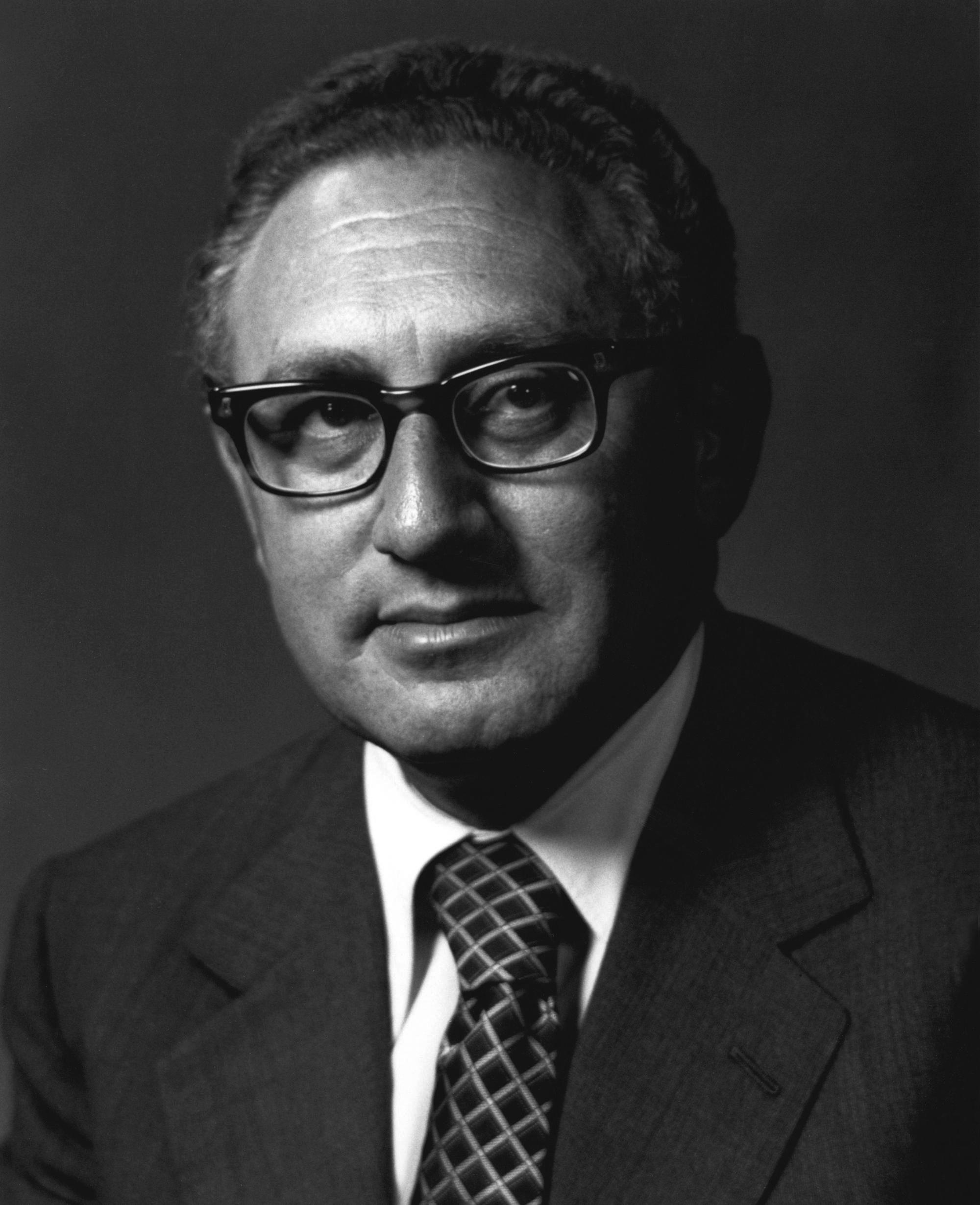
When it was announced that Henry Kissinger was to be awarded the Nobel Peace Prize in 1973, two of the Norwegian Nobel Committee members resigned in protest

Among other criticisms, the Nobel Committees have been accused of having a political agenda, and of omitting more deserving candidates. They have also been accused of Eurocentrism, especially for the Literature Prize.

Peace Prize

Among the most criticised Nobel Peace Prizes was the one awarded to Henry Kissinger and Lê Đức Thọ. This led to the resignation of two Norwegian Nobel Committee members. Kissinger and Thọ were awarded the prize for negotiating a ceasefire between North Vietnam and the United States in January 1973 during the Vietnam War. However, when the award was announced, both sides were still engaging in hostilities. Critics sympathetic to the North announced that Kissinger was not a peace-maker but the opposite, responsible for widening the war. Those hostile to the North and what they considered its deceptive practices during negotiations were deprived of a chance to criticise Lê Đức Thọ, as he declined the award. The satirist and musician Tom Lehrer has remarked that "political satire became obsolete when Henry Kissinger was awarded the Nobel Peace Prize."

Yasser Arafat, Shimon Peres, and Yitzhak Rabin received the Peace Prize in 1994 for their efforts in making peace between Israel and Palestine. Immediately after the award was announced, one of the five Norwegian Nobel Committee members denounced Arafat as a terrorist and resigned. Additional misgivings about Arafat were widely expressed in various newspapers.

Another controversial Peace Prize was that awarded to Barack Obama in 2009. Nominations had closed only eleven days after Obama took office as President of the United States, but the actual evaluation occurred over the next eight months. Obama himself stated that he did not feel deserving of the award, or worthy of the company in which it would place him. Past Peace Prize laureates were divided, some saying that Obama deserved the award, and others saying he had not secured the achievements to yet merit such an accolade. Obama's award, along with the previous Peace Prizes for Jimmy Carter and Al Gore, also prompted accusations of favoring U.S. Democratic politicians.

Aung San Suu Kyi was awarded the Peace Prize in 1991. However, in 2015, when she came into power in Myanmar, she was criticized for being silent on human rights violations under her rule and especially over the Rohingya genocide and calls were made to strip her of her Nobel Peace Prize.

Literature Prize

The award of the 2004 Literature Prize to Elfriede Jelinek drew a protest from a member of the Swedish Academy, Knut Ahnlund. Ahnlund resigned, alleging that the selection of Jelinek had caused "irreparable damage to all progressive forces, it has also confused the general view of literature as an art". He alleged that Jelinek's works were "a mass of text shovelled together without artistic structure". The 2009 Literature Prize to Herta Müller also generated criticism. According to The Washington Post, many US literary critics and professors were ignorant of her work. This made those critics feel the prizes were too Eurocentric. The 2019 Literature Prize to Peter Handke received heavy criticisms from various authors, such as Salman Rushdie and Hari Kunzru, and was condemned by the governments of Bosnia and Herzegovina, Kosovo, and Turkey, due to his history of Bosnian genocide denialism and his support for Slobodan Milošević.

Science prizes

In 1949, the neurologist António Egas Moniz received the Physiology or Medicine Prize for his development of the prefrontal lobotomy. The previous year, Walter Freeman had developed a version of the procedure which was faster and easier to carry out. Due in part to the publicity surrounding the original procedure, Freeman's procedure was prescribed without due consideration or regard for modern medical ethics. Endorsed by such influential publications as The New England Journal of Medicine, leucotomy or "lobotomy" became so popular that about 5,000 lobotomies were performed in the United States in the three years immediately following Moniz's receipt of the Prize.

=== Overlooked achievements ===
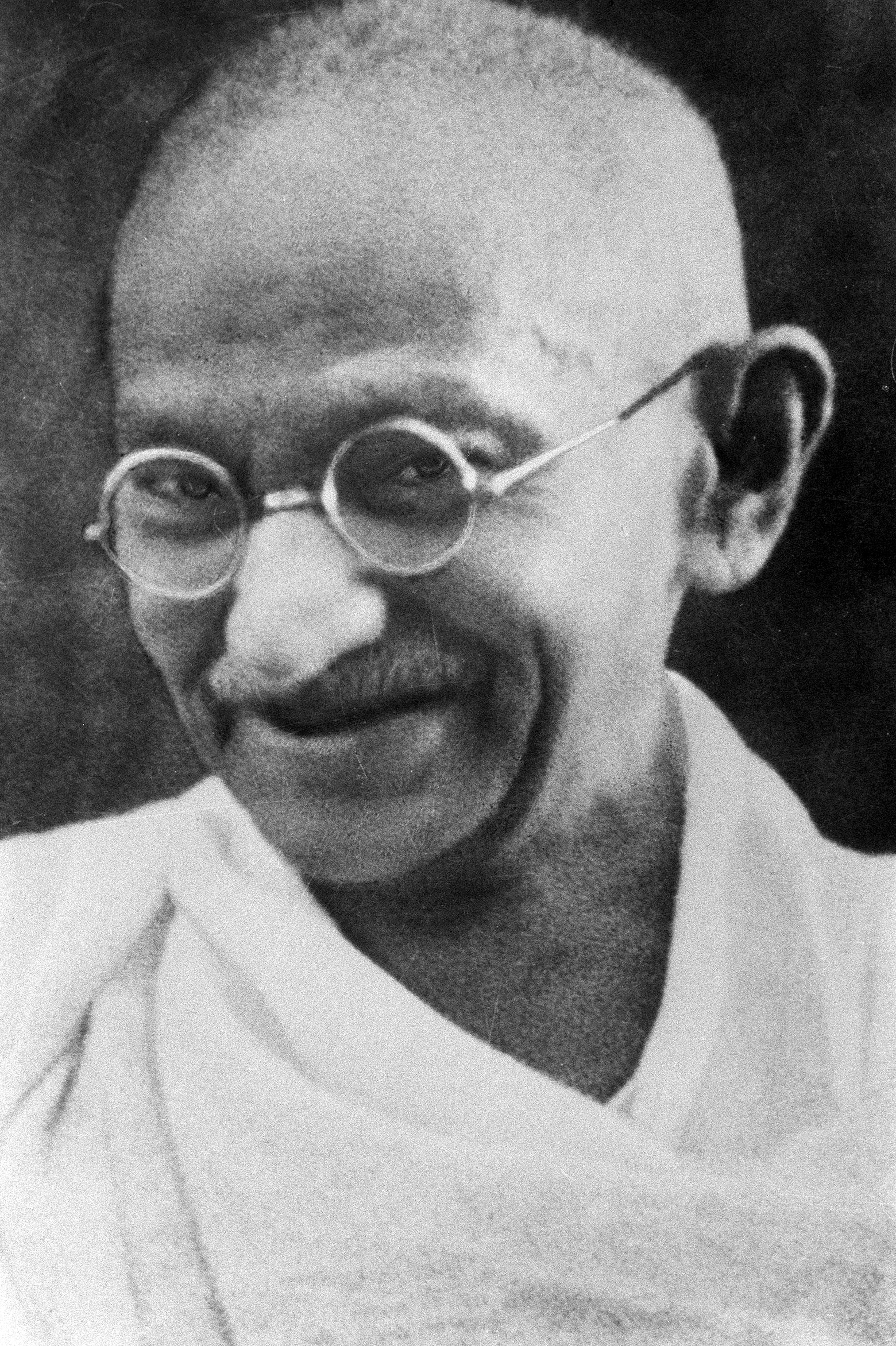
Mohandas Gandhi, although nominated five times, was never awarded a Nobel Peace Prize

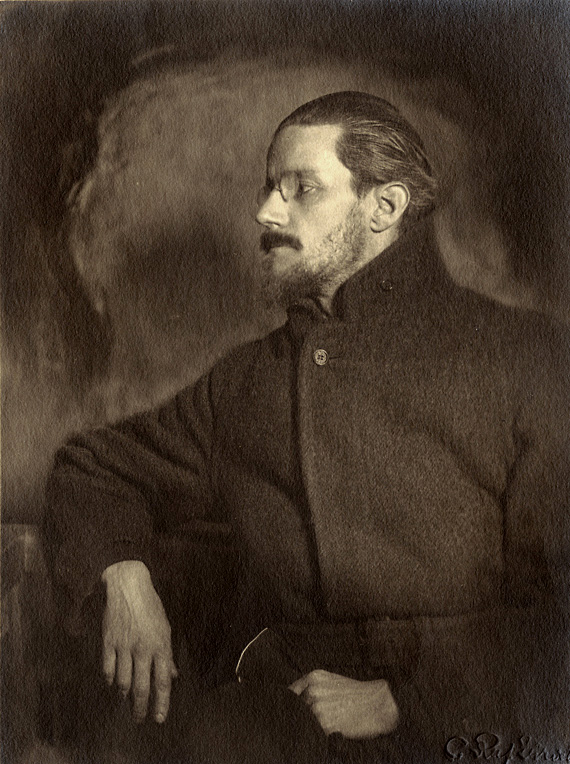
James Joyce, one of the controversial omissions of the Nobel Prize in Literature

Although Mohandas Gandhi, an icon of nonviolence in the 20th century, was nominated for the Nobel Peace Prize five times, in 1937, 1938, 1939, 1947, and a few days before he was assassinated on 30 January 1948, he was never awarded the prize. In 1948, the year of Gandhi's death, the Norwegian Nobel Committee decided to make no award that year on the grounds that "there was no suitable living candidate". In 1989, this omission was publicly regretted, when the 14th Dalai Lama was awarded the Peace Prize, the chairman of the committee said that it was "in part a tribute to the memory of Mahatma Gandhi". Geir Lundestad, 2006 Secretary of Norwegian Nobel Committee, said

The greatest omission in our 106-year history is undoubtedly that Mahatma Gandhi never received the Nobel Peace Prize. Gandhi could do without the Nobel Peace Prize. Whether the Nobel committee can do without Gandhi, is the question.

Other high-profile individuals with widely recognised contributions to peace have been overlooked. In 2009, an article in Foreign Policy magazine identified seven people who "never won the prize, but should have". The list consisted of Gandhi, Eleanor Roosevelt, Václav Havel, Ken Saro-Wiwa, Sari Nusseibeh, Corazon Aquino, and Liu Xiaobo. Liu Xiaobo would go on to win the 2010 Nobel Peace Prize while imprisoned.

In 1965, UN Secretary General U Thant was informed by the Norwegian Permanent Representative to the UN that he would be awarded that year's prize and asked whether or not he would accept. He consulted staff and later replied that he would. At the same time, Chairman Gunnar Jahn of the Nobel Peace Prize committee lobbied heavily against giving U Thant the prize and the prize was at the last minute awarded to UNICEF. The rest of the committee all wanted the prize to go to U Thant, for his work in defusing the Cuban Missile Crisis, ending the war in the Congo, and his ongoing work to mediate an end to the Vietnam War. The disagreement lasted three years and in 1966 and 1967 no prize was given, with Gunnar Jahn effectively vetoing an award to U Thant.

The Literature Prize also has controversial omissions. Adam Kirsch has suggested that many notable writers have missed out on the award for political or extra-literary reasons. The heavy focus on European and Swedish authors has been a subject of criticism. The Eurocentric nature of the award was acknowledged by Peter Englund, the 2009 Permanent Secretary of the Swedish Academy, as a problem with the award and was attributed to the tendency for the academy to relate more to European authors. This tendency towards European authors still leaves many European writers on a list of notable writers that have been overlooked for the Literature Prize, including Leo Tolstoy, Anton Chekhov, J. R. R. Tolkien, Émile Zola, Marcel Proust, Vladimir Nabokov, James Joyce, August Strindberg, Simon Vestdijk, Karel Čapek; the New World's Jorge Luis Borges, Ezra Pound, John Updike, Arthur Miller, Mark Twain; and Africa's Chinua Achebe.

Candidates can receive multiple nominations the same year. Gaston Ramon received a total of 155 nominations in physiology or medicine from 1930 to 1953, the last year with public nomination data for that award as of 2016. He died in 1963 without being awarded. Pierre Paul Émile Roux received 115 nominations in physiology or medicine, and Arnold Sommerfeld received 84 in physics. These are the three most nominated scientists without awards in the data published as of 2016. Otto Stern received 79 nominations in physics 1925–1943 before being awarded in 1943.

The strict rule against awarding a prize to more than three people is also controversial. When a prize is awarded to recognise an achievement by a team of more than three collaborators, one or more will miss out. For example, in 2002, the prize was awarded to Koichi Tanaka and John Fenn for the development of mass spectrometry in protein chemistry, an award that did not recognise the achievements of Franz Hillenkamp and Michael Karas of the Institute for Physical and Theoretical Chemistry at the University of Frankfurt.

According to one of the nominees for the prize in physics, the three person limit deprived him and two other members of his team of the honor in 2013: the team of Carl Hagen, Gerald Guralnik, and Tom Kibble published a paper in 1964 that gave answers to how the cosmos began, but did not share the 2013 Physics Prize awarded to Peter Higgs and François Englert, who had also published papers in 1964 concerning the subject. All five physicists arrived at the same conclusion, albeit from different angles. Hagen contends that an equitable solution is to either abandon the three limit restriction, or expand the time period of recognition for a given achievement to two years.

Similarly, the prohibition of posthumous awards fails to recognise achievements by an individual or collaborator who dies before the prize is awarded. The Economics Prize was not awarded to Fischer Black, who died in 1995, when his co-author Myron Scholes received the honor in 1997 for their landmark work on option pricing along with Robert C. Merton, another pioneer in the development of valuation of stock options. In the announcement of the award that year, the Nobel committee prominently mentioned Black's key role.

Political subterfuge may also deny proper recognition. Lise Meitner and Fritz Strassmann, who co-discovered nuclear fission along with Otto Hahn, may have been denied a share of Hahn's 1944 Nobel Chemistry Award due to having fled Germany when the Nazis came to power. The Meitner and Strassmann roles in the research was not fully recognised until years later, when they joined Hahn in receiving the 1966 Enrico Fermi Award.

=== Emphasis on discoveries over inventions ===
Alfred Nobel left his fortune to finance annual prizes to be awarded "to those who, during the preceding year, shall have conferred the greatest benefit on mankind". He stated that the Nobel Prizes in Physics should be given "to the person who shall have made the most important 'discovery' or 'invention' within the field of physics". Nobel did not emphasise discoveries, but they have historically been held in higher respect by the Nobel Prize Committee than inventions: 77% of the Physics Prizes have been given to discoveries, compared with only 23% to inventions. Christoph Bartneck and Matthias Rauterberg, in papers published in Nature and Technoetic Arts, have argued this emphasis on discoveries has moved the Nobel Prize away from its original intention of rewarding the greatest contribution to society.

=== Gender ===
In terms of the most prestigious awards in STEM fields, only a small proportion have been awarded to women. Out of 210 laureates in Physics, 181 in Chemistry and 216 in Medicine between 1901 and 2018, there were only three female laureates in physics, five in chemistry and 12 in medicine. Factors proposed to contribute to the discrepancy between this and the roughly equal human sex ratio include biased nominations, fewer women than men being active in the relevant fields, Nobel Prizes typically being awarded decades after the research was done (reflecting a time when gender bias in the relevant fields was greater), a greater delay in awarding Nobel Prizes for women's achievements making longevity a more important factor for women (one cannot be nominated for the Nobel Prize posthumously), and a tendency to omit women from jointly awarded Nobel Prizes. Despite these factors, Marie Curie is to date the only person awarded Nobel Prizes in two different sciences (Physics in 1903, Chemistry in 1911); she is one of only three people who have received two Nobel Prizes in sciences (see Multiple Laureates above). Malala Yousafzai is the youngest person ever to be awarded the Nobel Peace Prize. When she received it in 2014, she was only 17 years old.

=== Status of the Economic Sciences Prize ===
Peter Nobel described the Bank of Sweden Prize in Economic Sciences in Memory of Alfred Nobel as a "false Nobel prize" that dishonours his relative Alfred Nobel, after whom the prize is named, and considers economics to be a pseudoscience.

== Refusals and constraints ==
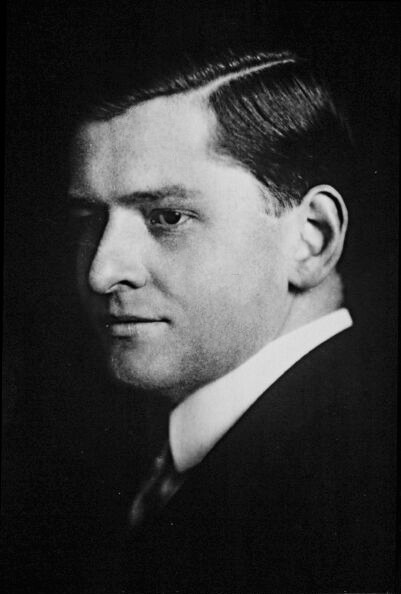
Richard Kuhn, who was forced to decline his Nobel Prize in Chemistry

Two laureates have voluntarily declined the Nobel Prize. In 1964, Jean-Paul Sartre was awarded the Literature Prize, but refused, stating, "A writer must refuse to allow himself to be transformed into an institution, even if it takes place in the most honourable form." Lê Đức Thọ, chosen for the 1973 Peace Prize for his role in the Paris Peace Accords, declined, stating that there was no actual peace in Vietnam. George Bernard Shaw attempted to decline the prize money while accepting the 1925 Literature Prize; eventually it was agreed to use it to found the Anglo-Swedish Literary Foundation.

During the Third Reich, Adolf Hitler hindered Richard Kuhn, Adolf Butenandt, and Gerhard Domagk from accepting their prizes. All of them were awarded their diplomas and gold medals after World War II.

In 1958, Boris Pasternak declined his prize for literature due to fear of what the Soviet Union government might do if he travelled to Stockholm to accept his prize. In return, the Swedish Academy refused his refusal, saying "this refusal, of course, in no way alters the validity of the award." The academy announced with regret that the presentation of the Literature Prize could not take place that year, holding it back until 1989 when Pasternak's son accepted the prize on his behalf.

Aung San Suu Kyi was awarded the Nobel Peace Prize in 1991, but her children accepted the prize because she had been placed under house arrest in Burma; Suu Kyi delivered her speech two decades later, in 2012. Liu Xiaobo was awarded the Nobel Peace Prize in 2010 while he and his wife were under house arrest in China as political prisoners, and he was unable to accept the prize in his lifetime.

== Impact ==
=== Cultural ===
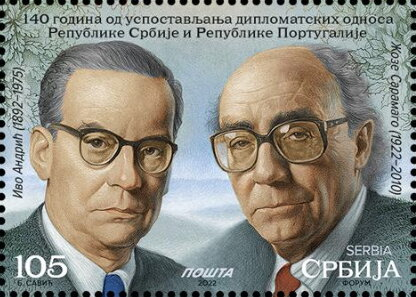
The Nobel Prize in Literature laureates Ivo Andrić (recipient in 1961) and José Saramago (recipient in 1998) pictured on a 2022 Serbian stamp

Being a symbol of scientific or literary achievement that is recognisable worldwide, the Nobel Prize is often depicted in fiction. This includes films such as The Prize (1963), Nobel Son (2007), and The Wife (2017) about fictional Nobel laureates, as well as fictionalised accounts of stories surrounding real prizes such as Nobel Chor, a 2012 film based on the theft of Rabindranath Tagore's prize. It has also been depicted in television shows such as The Big Bang Theory.

The statue and memorial symbol Planet of Alfred Nobel was opened in Alfred Nobel University of Economics and Law in Dnipro, Ukraine in 2008. On the globe, there are 802 Nobel laureates' reliefs made of a composite alloy obtained when disposing of military strategic missiles.

Despite the symbolism of intellectual achievement, some recipients have embraced unsupported and pseudoscientific concepts, including various health benefits of vitamin C and other dietary supplements, homeopathy, HIV/AIDS denialism, and various claims about race and intelligence. This is sometimes referred to as Nobel disease.

In 2001, Gustavus Adolphus College in St. Peter, Minnesota, host of the Nobel Conference, commissioned American composer and alumnus Steve Heitzeg to compose a piece for the 100th anniversary of the Nobel Prizes. The 75-minute Nobel Symphony highlights all the major Nobel Prizes, and includes texts from Nobel laureates such as Pablo Neruda, Albert Camus, Toni Morrison, Amartya Sen, Martin Luther King, Jr., Rigoberta Menchú, Dag Hammarskjöld, and Nelson Mandela. The Nobel Symphony premiered at Gustavus Adolphus on October 2, 2001, and was restaged by Philip Brunelle and VocalEssence at Orchestra Hall in Minneapolis, Minnesota on April 18, 2004.

== See also ==
- List of Nobel laureates
  - List of Asian Nobel laureates
  - List of female Nobel laureates
  - List of Jewish Nobel laureates
  - List of Nobel laureates by country
  - List of Nobel laureates by university affiliation
  - List of Nobel laureates in Chemistry
  - List of Nobel laureates in Literature
  - List of Nobel laureates in Physics
  - List of Nobel laureates in Physiology or Medicine
  - List of Nobel Memorial Prize laureates in Economics
  - List of Nobel Peace Prize laureates
- Abel Prize – Norwegian international mathematics prize
- Fields Medal – Mathematics award
- Ig Nobel Prize – Annually awarded parody of the Nobel Prize
- Lindau Nobel Laureate Meetings – Annual scientific conference in Germany
- List of prizes known as the Nobel of a field
- Lists of science and technology awards
- Nobel Conference – Academic conference held annually at Gustavus Adolphus College
- Nobel Library – Library in Stockholm, Sweden
- Nobel Prize effect – Observation about the adverse effects of receiving the Nobel Prize
- Nobel Prize medal
- Nobel Prize Museum – Museum about Alfred Nobel and the Nobel Prize
