= Nobel disease =

Embracing of scientifically unsound ideas by Nobel laureates

Nobel disease or Nobelitis is an informal term for the embrace of strange or scientifically unsound ideas by some Nobel Prize winners, usually later in life. It has been argued that the effect results, in part, from a tendency for Nobel winners to feel empowered by the award to speak on topics outside their specific area of expertise, although it is unknown whether Nobel Prize winners are more prone to this tendency than other individuals. Paul Nurse, co-winner of the 2001 Nobel Prize in Physiology or Medicine, warned later laureates against "believing you are expert in almost everything, and being prepared to express opinions about most issues with great confidence, sheltering behind the authority that the Nobel Prize can give you". Nurse also noted the media's role in reinforcing this tendency, observing that after receiving his Nobel Prize, journalists had begun to take him seriously when he commented on issues about which he knew little.

== Implications ==
While it remains unclear whether Nobel winners are statistically more prone to critical thinking errors than other scientists, the phenomenon provides an existence proof that being an authority in one field does not necessarily make one an authority in any other field, and, to the extent that winning a Nobel Prize serves as a proxy indicator of scientific brilliance and high general intelligence, such characteristics are not incompatible with irrationality.

Nobel disease demonstrates that, for some prize winners, being universally hailed as correct appears to bolster the individual laureate's confirmation bias more than it does their skepticism. Milton Friedman, winner of the Nobel Memorial Prize in Economic Sciences in 1976, said this of the Nobel disease as it relates to his economic thinking towards an "antidote":

I myself have been asked my opinion on everything from a cure for the common cold to the market value of a letter signed by John F. Kennedy. Needless to say the attention [from receiving a Nobel prize] is flattering, but also corrupting. Somehow we badly need an antidote for both the inflated attention granted a Nobel laureate in areas outside his competence and the inflated ego each of us is in danger of acquiring. My own field suggests one obvious antidote: competition through the establishment of many more awards. But a product that has been so successful is not easy to replace. Hence, I suspect that our inflated egos are safe for a good long time to come.

== Winners reported as examples ==
=== Phillip Lenard ===
Phillip Lenard won the 1905 Nobel Prize in Physics for his work on cathode rays. He was a supporter of the Nazi party, and promoted the idea of Deutsche Physik and Jewish physics.

=== Alexis Carrel ===
Alexis Carrel, winner of the 1912 Nobel Prize in Physiology or Medicine for the invention of the perfusion pump, became an advocate of eugenic policies in Vichy France.

=== Charles Richet ===
Charles Richet won the 1913 Nobel Prize in Physiology or Medicine for his research on anaphylaxis. He also believed in extrasensory perception, paranormal activity, dowsing, and ghosts.

=== Linus Pauling ===
Linus Pauling won the 1954 Nobel Prize in Chemistry for his work on chemical bonds and the Nobel Peace Prize in 1962 for his peace activism. A decade before winning the first prize, he was diagnosed with Bright's disease, which he treated in part by ingesting vitamin supplements, which he claimed dramatically improved his condition. He later espoused taking high doses of vitamin C to reduce the likelihood and severity of experiencing the common cold. Pauling himself consumed amounts of vitamin C on a daily basis that were more than 120 times the recommended daily intake. He further argued that megadoses of vitamin C have therapeutic value for treating schizophrenia and for prolonging cancer patients' lives. These claims are not supported by the best available science.

=== William Shockley ===
William Shockley, who shared the 1956 Nobel Prize in Physics with Walter Houser Brattain and John Bardeen for their invention of the point-contact transistor, believed in racialism and eugenics.

=== James Watson ===
James Watson was awarded the 1962 Nobel Prize in Physiology or Medicine, together with Francis Crick and Maurice Wilkins, "for their discoveries concerning the molecular structure of nucleic acids and its significance for information transfer in living material". Since at least 2000, Watson consistently and publicly claimed that black people are on average less intelligent than white people, and that exposure to sunlight in tropical regions and higher levels of melanin cause dark-skinned people to have a higher sex drive.

=== Nikolaas Tinbergen ===
Nikolaas Tinbergen won the 1973 Nobel Prize in Physiology or Medicine for discoveries concerning the organization and elicitation of individual and social behavior patterns in animals. During his Nobel acceptance speech, Tinbergen promoted the widely discredited "refrigerator mother" hypothesis of the causation of autism. In 1985, Tinbergen coauthored a book with his wife that recommended the use of "holding therapy" for autism, a form of treatment that is empirically unsupported and that can be physically dangerous.

=== Brian Josephson ===
Brian Josephson won the Nobel Prize in Physics in 1973 for his prediction of the Josephson effect. Josephson has promoted a number of scientifically unsupported or discredited beliefs, including the homeopathic notion that water can somehow "remember" the chemical properties of substances diluted within it (cf. § Luc Montagnier); the view that transcendental meditation is helpful for bringing unconscious traumatic memories into conscious awareness; and the possibility that humans can communicate with each other by telepathy.

=== Kary Mullis ===
Kary Mullis won the 1993 Nobel Prize in Chemistry for development of the polymerase chain reaction. Mullis disagreed with the scientifically accepted view that AIDS is caused by HIV, claiming that the virus is barely detectable in people with the disease. He also expressed doubt in the evidence for human-caused climate change. In his autobiography, Mullis professed a belief in astrology and wrote about an encounter with a fluorescent, talking raccoon that he suggested might have been an extraterrestrial alien.

=== Louis J. Ignarro ===
Louis J. Ignarro was one of three winners of the 1998 Nobel Prize in Physiology or Medicine for his research on nitric oxide as a signaling molecule in the cardiovascular system, which led to the development of new medications to treat cardiovascular disease, as well as of Viagra. In 2003, he became a consultant for Herbalife (which has been investigated for various kinds of dishonesty about its products). As a member of their Scientific Advisory Board, he helped to promote dubious dietary supplements. He studied the effects of his pet invention, Niteworks, on mice, and is known for saying, "What's good for mice is good for humans," an unverified statement.

=== Luc Montagnier ===
Luc Montagnier co-discovered HIV in 1983, for which he won the 2008 Nobel Prize in Physiology or Medicine. In 2009, in a non-peer-reviewed paper in a journal that he had founded, Montagnier claimed that solutions containing the DNA of pathogenic bacteria and viruses could emit low frequency radio waves that induce surrounding water molecules to become arranged into "nanostructures". He suggested water could retain such properties even after the original solutions were massively diluted, to the point where the original DNA had effectively vanished, and that water could retain the "memory" of substances with which it had been in contact – claims that place his work in close alignment with the pseudoscientific tenets of homeopathy (cf. § Brian Josephson). He further claimed that DNA sequence information could be "teleported" to a separate test tube of purified water via these radio waves. He explained this in the framework of quantum field theory. He supported the scientifically discredited view that vaccines cause autism and has claimed that antibiotics are of therapeutic value in the treatment of autism. During the COVID-19 pandemic, Montagnier promoted the idea that SARS-CoV-2 was deliberately created and escaped from a laboratory, a claim which has been rejected by other virologists.

=== Other Nobelists ===
Scott O. Lilienfeld et al. list more examples of "Nobel laureates who held/hold weird ideas": Pierre Curie, who participated in spiritual seances; John William Strutt, who "was fond of parapsychology"; J. J. Thomson, who was interested in psychic phenomena; Santiago Ramón y Cajal, who wrote a book "on hypnosis, spiritualism, and metaphysics"; Wolfgang Pauli, who, together with Carl Jung, "developed the concept of synchronicity"; Egas Moniz, for his belief that lobotomy can treat mental illnesses; Julian Schwinger, for his work on cold fusion; Ivar Giaever, for global warming skepticism; Arthur Schawlow, for his support of a subsequently debunked "technique of facilitated communication for autism"; and Richard Smalley, for promotion of anti-evolutionary ideas.

== See also ==
- Argument from authority
- Dunning–Kruger effect
- History of the Nobel Prize
  - Nobel Prize controversies
  - Nobel Prize effect
- Sutor, ne ultra crepidam
- VIP syndrome
