= Norman Arnheim =

American biologist

Norman Arnheim is an American biologist specializing in aging and development biology, biochemistry, and molecular biology. He is currently a Distinguished Professor and the Ester Dornsife Chair at the University of Southern California, and an Elected Fellow of the American Association for the Advancement of Science.
