= Michael L. Gross (ethicist) =

Michael L. Gross (Hebrew: מיכאל גרוס; born 1954) is a political ethicist and professor of political science at the University of Haifa where he is Chair of the Division of International Relations.

He is the author of Bioethics and Armed Conflict, the first comprehensive study of medical ethics in conventional, unconventional, and low-intensity war which examines the dilemmas that arise when bioethical principles clash with military necessity. His contention is that medical ethics in time of war cannot be identical to medical ethics in peacetime. He is also the author of Moral Dilemmas of Modern War: Torture, Assassination, and Blackmail in an Age of Asymmetric Conflict (2010), Cambridge University Press, a wide-ranging study of military ethics, terrorism, modern weaponry and civilian immunity in contemporary armed conflict.

== Works ==
- The Ethics of Insurgency: A Critical Guide to Just Guerrilla Warfare. Cambridge: Cambridge University Press, 2015. ISBN 978-1-107-68464-5; ISBN 978-1-107-01907-2
- Ethics and Activism: The Theory and Practice of Political Morality (1997), Cambridge University Press
- Bioethics and Armed Conflict (2006), The MIT Press
- Moral Dilemmas of Modern War: Torture, Assassination, and Blackmail in an Age of Asymmetric Conflict (2010), Cambridge University Press
