= Nobel Prize effect =

Observation about the adverse effects of receiving the Nobel Prize

The Nobel Prize effect is an observation about the adverse effects of receiving the Nobel Prize on laureates and their careers. These effects include reduced productivity, constraints in areas of work, and public perception of expertise in areas unrelated to the laureate's work. The term Nobel effect is also used in those contexts, as well as in the context of the laureate's longevity, and influence on international law in the case of the Nobel Peace Prize.

== Productivity ==
The definition of the "Nobel Prize effect" most attributed to Richard Hamming describes the effect as a reduction in productivity, making it hard for a scientist to work on small problems after receiving the prize. During a speech at a seminar, Hamming described a scene at the Nobel awards ceremony as follows:

... all three laureates got up and made speeches. The third one, Brattain, practically with tears in his eyes, said, "I know about this Nobel-Prize effect and I am not going to let it affect me; I am going to remain good old Walter Brattain." Well I said to myself, "That is nice." But in a few weeks I saw it was affecting him. Now he could only work on great problems.

== Public perception ==
The Nobel Prize effect is also described as a consequence of public perception of the Nobel laureate, magnified by the worldwide exposure the laureate experiences. One example is for the Nobel laureate to be treated with reverence due to perception that the laureate has authoritative knowledge about any subject outside the field in which they won the prize. Nobel Laureate Klaus von Klitzing describes the effect as a personal burden, because other people have a tendency to believe that a Nobel Prize laureate's knowledge extends to all areas. At the same time, he acknowledges that this is also a benefit, because people in positions of authority will pay attention to the views of Nobel laureates. As physicist Hubert Curien described the phenomenon in a Natural Environment Research Council lecture:

If someone wins the Nobel prize, he is immediately pounced upon by all kinds of people who ask him all kinds of questions on all kinds of subjects which he knows nothing about. It is very difficult to resist the temptation to reply – to give any old answer on subjects which he knows nothing about. We have seen colleagues who have won a Nobel prize talking nonsense on such and such a political question, on which they really have no knowledge.

Another example of the effect of new public perception is when the works of the Nobel Laureate suddenly become popular and in demand due to the fame that the Nobel Prize confers on the laureate. Canadian author Alice Munro, 2013 laureate to the Nobel Prize in Literature, suddenly found herself with a Chinese audience with such strong demands for her works that they quickly sold out, and two publishers in China became embroiled in a dispute over publication rights.

Perception among colleagues in the same discipline was thought to have a measurable effect on how often the Nobel laureate's works are cited before and after being awarded the prize. While a simple comparison of citation counts before and after the prize does suggest an impact, a study using matched synthetic control group in the analysis suggest that there is no such effect on either citation impact or related chain reactions of citations.

== Nobel disease ==
Nobel disease is a hypothesized affliction that results in certain Nobel Prize laureates embracing strange or scientifically unsound ideas, usually later in life. It has been argued that the effect results, in part, from a tendency for Nobel laureates to feel empowered by the award to speak on topics outside their specific area of expertise combined with a tendency for Nobel laureates to be the kinds of scientists who think in unconventional ways.

1976 Nobel laureate Milton Friedman said in a brief talk during the banquet (not during his formal Nobel lecture) that, "Someday we badly need an antidote for both the inflated attention granted a Nobel laureate in areas outside his competence and the inflated ego each of us is in danger of acquiring. My own field suggest one obvious antidote: competition through the establishment of many more awards. But a product that has been so successful [the Nobel Prize] is not easy to replace. Hence, I suspect that our inflated egos are safe for a good time to come."

== Nobel Peace Prize ==
In addition to the life-changing effects of receiving a Nobel prize, an alternative meaning exists for the Nobel effect in the context of the Nobel Peace Prize. In this context, legal scholars have argued whether Nobel Peace Prize laureates have, as a result of receiving the Prize, influenced the shaping of new norms in international law and international relations, and suggesting that the Peace Prize can be a significant factor in encouraging peacemaking among individuals worldwide.

== Longevity ==
An analysis of science Nobel Prize laureates born in the 19th century estimated that receiving the Nobel Prize correlated with one or two years of additional longevity for the recipient, compared to being merely nominated for the prize.

== See also ==
- Nobel disease
