= Michael Gross (science writer) =

British science writer

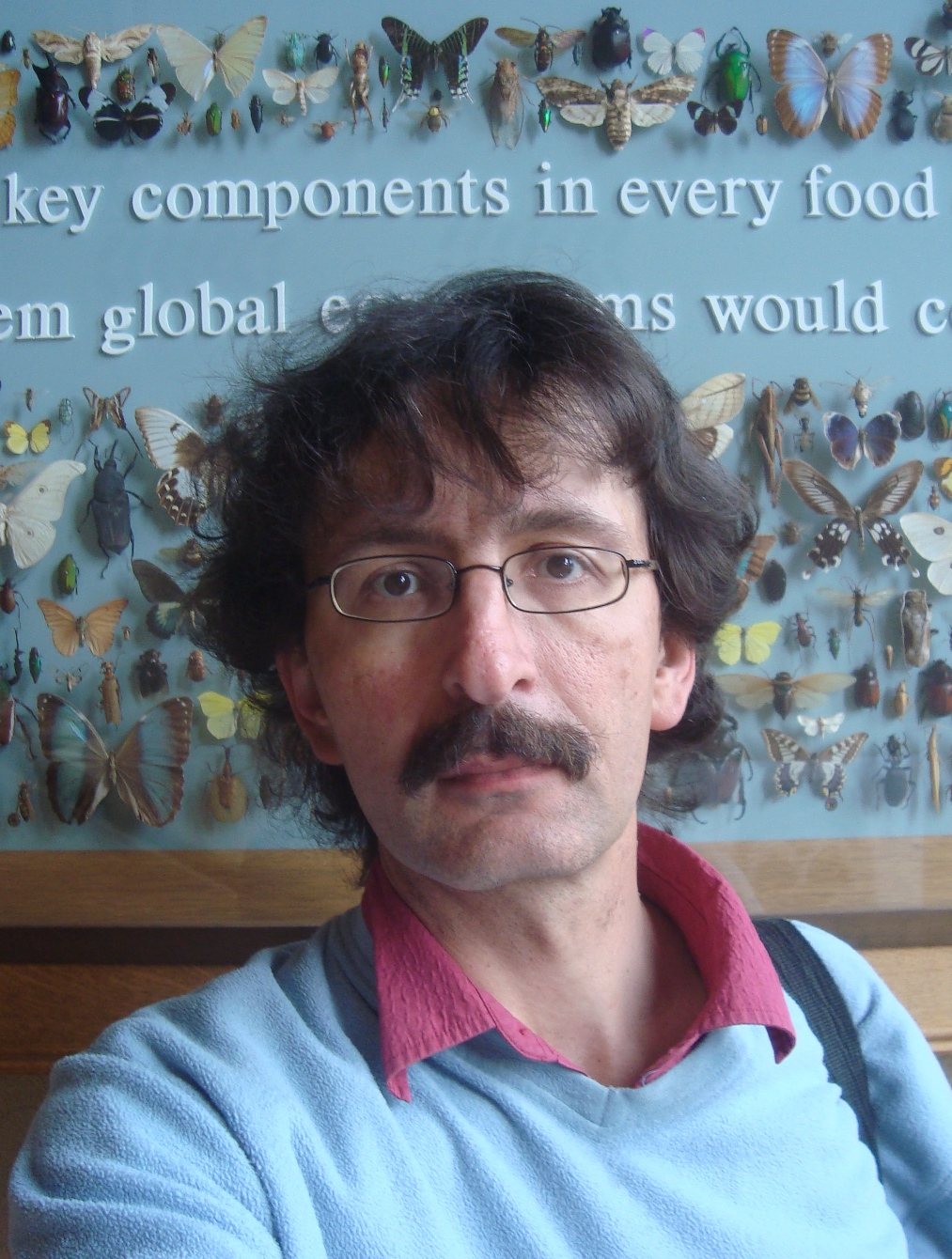
Michael Gross in 2011

Michael Gross (3 November 1963, Kirn, Germany) is a British science writer based at Oxford and has been awarded an honorary research fellowship at the School of Crystallography, Birkbeck, University of London.

== Biography ==
Gross studied engineering and chemistry at the Karlsruhe Institute of Technology, and he holds a doctorate in physical biochemistry from Regensburg University, both German institutions. During seven years of post-doctoral research in protein biochemistry at the University of Oxford, he wrote science journalism as a hobby. In 2000, he switched to writing full-time. Occasionally he also acts as a translator, editor, and lecturer. As of 2013, Gross was married and had three children.

== Works ==
Gross has been working as a science journalist since 1993, and became a "science writer in residence" at Birkbeck College in 2001. Gross is the author of around 30 research papers, over 700 journalistic pieces, and seven books, including Life on the Edge, Travels to the Nanoworld, and Light and Life. He writes in English and German and parts of his work have been translated into French, Spanish and Italian. He is married with three children and lives in Oxford.

=== Books ===
- Life on the Edge: Amazing Creatures Thriving in Extreme Environments. Plenum Trade. 1998.
- Travels to the Nanoworld: Miniature Machinery in Nature and Technology. Perseus. 2001.
- Light and Life. Oxford University Press. 2002.
- The Birds, the Bees and the Platypuses: Crazy, Sexy and Cool Stories from Science. Johns Hopkins University Press. 2008.

As co-author

- Plaxco, Kevin W.; Gross, Michael (2006). Astrobiology: A Brief Introduction. Johns Hopkins University Press. ISBN 0-8018-8367-9.

=== Articles ===
- Gross, Michael (9 November 2000). "Estonia sells its gene pool". Science. The Guardian. pp. 2 (120) – via Newspapers.com.
- Gross, Michael (29 March 2002). "Science Writer in Residence". Careers. Science (Autobiography). doi:10.1126/article.65146 (inactive 12 July 2025).
- Gross, Michael (14 June 2002). "An Odyssey in Biotech". Careers. Science. doi:10.1126/article.62942 (inactive 12 July 2025).
- Gross, Michael (25 April 2003). "Steering Biotech through Difficult Waters". Careers. Science. doi:10.1126/article.64020 (inactive 12 July 2025).
- Gross, Michael (30 October 2003). "Looking for good science on TV? Try the Simpsons, suggests Michael Gross". Life (Opinion). p. 9 – via Newspapers.com.
- Gross, Michael (2 February 2015). "Oceans of plastic waste". Current Biology (Feature). 25 (3): R93 – R96. Bibcode:2015CBio...25..R93G. doi:10.1016/j.cub.2015.01.038. PMID 25774385.
- Gross, Michael (3 April 2017). "A new continent for human evolution". Current Biology (Feature). 27 (7): PR243 – R245. Bibcode:2017CBio...27.R243G. doi:10.1016/j.cub.2017.03.035.
