= Electrical synapse =

Type of connection between neurons

- Diagram of a gap junction

Identifiers
- MeSH: D054351
- TH: H1.00.01.1.02024
- FMA: 67130

An electrical synapse is a synapse in which electrical current flows directly from one cell to another via a gap junction. It is one of the two major classes of synapses, the other being the chemical synapse. At a gap junction, the two neurons are separated by a very narrow gap of about 2–4 nm of each other, a distance much smaller than the 20- to 40-nanometer distance that separates cells at a chemical synapse. Electrical synapses co-exist with chemical synapses in the nervous system of many animals, from nematodes to arthropods to vertebrates, including mammals. Most synapses in the brain are chemical, but electrical synapses are an important minority with a distinct purpose.

Compared to chemical synapses, electrical synapses conduct nerve impulses faster and provide continuous-time bidirectional coupling via linked cytoplasm. As such, the notion of signal directionality across these synapses is not always defined. They are known to produce synchronization of network activity in the brain and can create chaotic network level dynamics. In situations where a signal direction can be defined, they lack gain (unlike chemical synapses)—the signal in the postsynaptic neuron is the same or smaller than that of the originating neuron. The fundamental bases for perceiving electrical synapses comes down to the connexons that are located in the gap junction between two neurons. Electrical synapses are often found in neural systems that require the fastest possible response, such as defensive reflexes. An important characteristic of electrical synapses is that they are mostly bidirectional, allowing impulse transmission in either direction.

== Structure ==
Each gap junction (sometimes called a nexus) contains numerous gap junction channels that cross the plasma membranes of both cells. With a lumen diameter of about 1.2 to 2.0 nm, the pore of a gap junction channel is wide enough to allow ions and even medium-size molecules like signaling molecules to flow from one cell to the next, thereby connecting the two cells' cytoplasm. Thus when the membrane potential of one cell changes, ions may move through from one cell to the next, carrying positive charge with them and depolarizing the postsynaptic cell.

Gap junction channels are composed of two hemichannels called connexons in vertebrates, one contributed by each cell at the synapse. Connexons are formed by six 7.5 nm long, four-pass membrane-spanning protein subunits called connexins, which may be identical or slightly different from one another.

An autapse is an electrical (or chemical) synapse formed when the axon of one neuron synapses with its own dendrites.

== Effects ==
They are found in many regions in animal and human body. The simplicity of electrical synapses results in synapses that are fast, but more importantly the bidirectional coupling can produce very complex behaviors at the network level.

- Without the need for receptors to recognize chemical messengers, signal transmission at electrical synapses is more rapid than that which occurs across chemical synapses, the predominant kind of junctions between neurons. Chemical transmission exhibits synaptic delay—recordings from squid synapses and neuromuscular junctions of the frog reveal a delay of 0.5 to 4.0 milliseconds—whereas electrical transmission takes place with almost no delay. However, the difference in speed between chemical and electrical synapses is not as marked in mammals as it is in cold-blooded animals.
- Because electrical synapses do not involve neurotransmitters, electrical neurotransmission is less modifiable than chemical neurotransmission.
- The response always has the same sign as the source. For example, depolarization of the pre-synaptic membrane will always induce a depolarization in the post-synaptic membrane, and vice versa for hyperpolarization.
- The response in the postsynaptic neuron is in general smaller in amplitude than the source. The amount of attenuation of the signal is due to the membrane resistance of the presynaptic and postsynaptic neurons.
- Long-term changes can be seen in electrical synapses. For example, changes in electrical synapses in the retina are seen during light and dark adaptations of the retina.

The relative speed of electrical synapses also allows for many neurons to fire synchronously. Because of the speed of transmission, electrical synapses are found in escape mechanisms and other processes that require quick responses, such as the response to danger of the sea hare Aplysia, which quickly releases large quantities of ink to obscure enemies' vision.

Normally, current carried by ions could travel in either direction through this type of synapse. However, sometimes the junctions are rectifying synapses, containing voltage-gated ion channels that open in response to depolarization of an axon's plasma membrane, and prevent current from traveling in one of the two directions. Some channels may also close in response to increased calcium (Ca^{2+}) or hydrogen (H^{+}) ion concentration, so as not to spread damage from one cell to another.

There is also evidence of synaptic plasticity where the electrical connection established can either be strengthened or weakened as a result of activity, or during changes in the intracellular concentration of magnesium.

Electrical synapses are present throughout the central nervous system and have been studied specifically in the neocortex, hippocampus, thalamic reticular nucleus, locus coeruleus, inferior olivary nucleus, mesencephalic nucleus of the trigeminal nerve, olfactory bulb, retina, and spinal cord of vertebrates. Other examples of functional gap junctions detected in vivo are in the striatum, cerebellum, and suprachiasmatic nucleus.

== History ==
The model of a reticular network of directly interconnected cells was one of the early hypotheses for the organization of the nervous system at the beginning of the 20th century. This reticular hypothesis was considered to conflict directly with the now predominant neuron doctrine, a model in which isolated, individual neurons signal to each other chemically across synaptic gaps. These two models came into sharp contrast at the award ceremony for the 1906 Nobel Prize in Physiology or Medicine, in which the award went jointly to Camillo Golgi, a reticularist and widely recognized cell biologist, and Santiago Ramón y Cajal, the champion of the neuron doctrine and the father of modern neuroscience. Golgi delivered his Nobel lecture first, in part detailing evidence for a reticular model of the nervous system. Ramón y Cajal then took the podium and refuted Golgi's conclusions in his lecture. Modern understanding of the coexistence of chemical and electrical synapses, however, suggests that both models are physiologically significant; it could be said that the Nobel committee acted with great foresight in awarding the Prize jointly.

There was substantial debate on whether the transmission of information between neurons was chemical or electrical in the first decades of the twentieth century, but chemical synaptic transmission was seen as the only answer after Otto Loewi's demonstration of chemical communication between neurons and heart muscle. Thus, the discovery of electrical communication was surprising.

Electrical synapses were first demonstrated between escape-related giant neurons in crayfish in the late 1950s, and were later found in vertebrates.

== See also ==
- Junctional complex
- Cardiac muscle

== Sources ==
- Kandel, ER; Schwartz, JH; Jessell, TM (2000). Principles of Neural Science (4th ed.). New York: McGraw-Hill. ISBN 978-0-8385-7701-1.
