= Golgi =

Golgi may refer to:

- Camillo Golgi (1843–1926), Italian physician and scientist after whom the following terms are named:
  - Golgi apparatus (also called the Golgi body, Golgi complex, or dictyosome), an organelle in a eukaryotic cell
  - Golgi tendon organ, a proprioceptive sensory receptor organ
  - Golgi's method or Golgi stain, a nervous tissue staining technique
  - Golgi alpha-mannosidase II, an enzyme
  - Golgi cell, a type of interneuron found in the cerebellum
  - Golgi I, a nerve cell with a long axon
  - Golgi II, a nerve cell with a short or no axon
- Golgi (crater), a lunar impact crater
- Córteno Golgi, an Italian village
- Golgi, an ancient town in Cyprus
