= Neuroscientist =

Individual who studies neuroscience

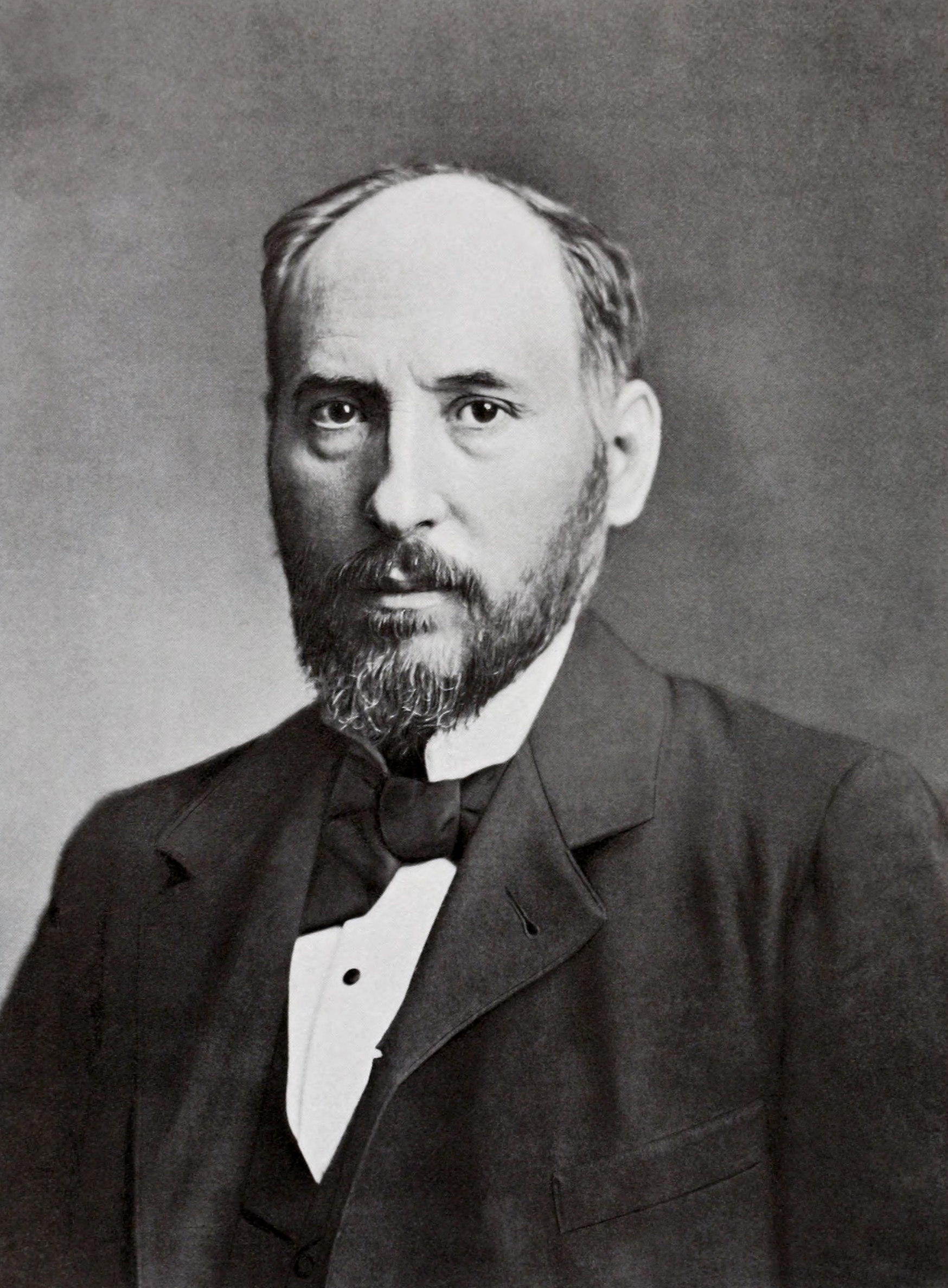
Santiago Ramón y Cajal, the father of modern neuroscience and a Spanish neuroscientist, received the Nobel Prize in Medicine in 1906 for his discovery of the neuron doctrine. He shared the prize with Camillo Golgi, an Italian neuroscientist who was recognized for his staining technique that allowed neurons to be visualized.

A neuroscientist (or neurobiologist) is a scientist specializing in neuroscience that deals with the anatomy and function of neurons, neural circuits, and glia, and their behavioral, biological, and psychological roles in health and disease.

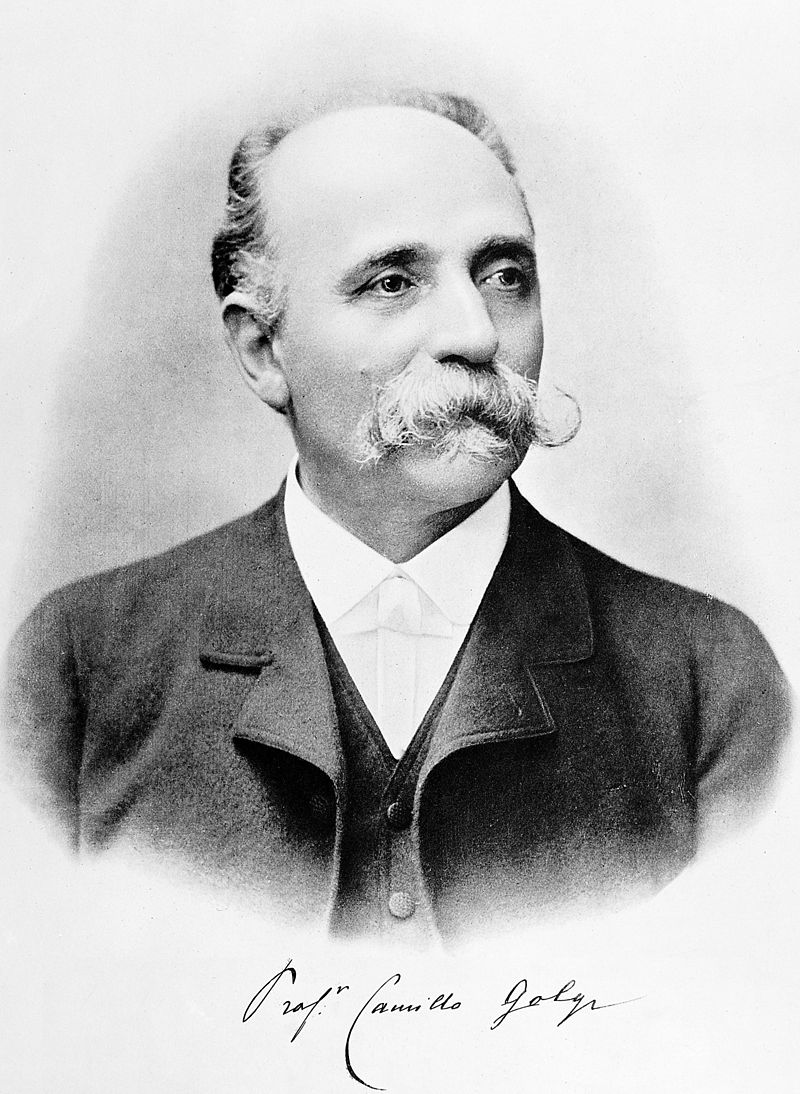
Camillo Golgi (1843–1926), Italian physician, neuroscientist, and namesake of the Golgi apparatus

Neuroscientists generally work as researchers within a college, university, government agency, or private industry setting. In research-oriented careers, neuroscientists design and conduct scientific experiments on the nervous system and its functions. They can engage in basic or applied research. Basic research seeks to expand current understanding of the nervous system, whereas applied research seeks to address a specific problem, such as developing a treatment for a neurological disorder.

Neuroscientists have numerous career opportunities outside of academic research, including careers in industry, science writing, government program management, science advocacy, and education. A neuroscientist commonly holds a doctorate in a medical science.

== Job overview ==
=== Job description ===
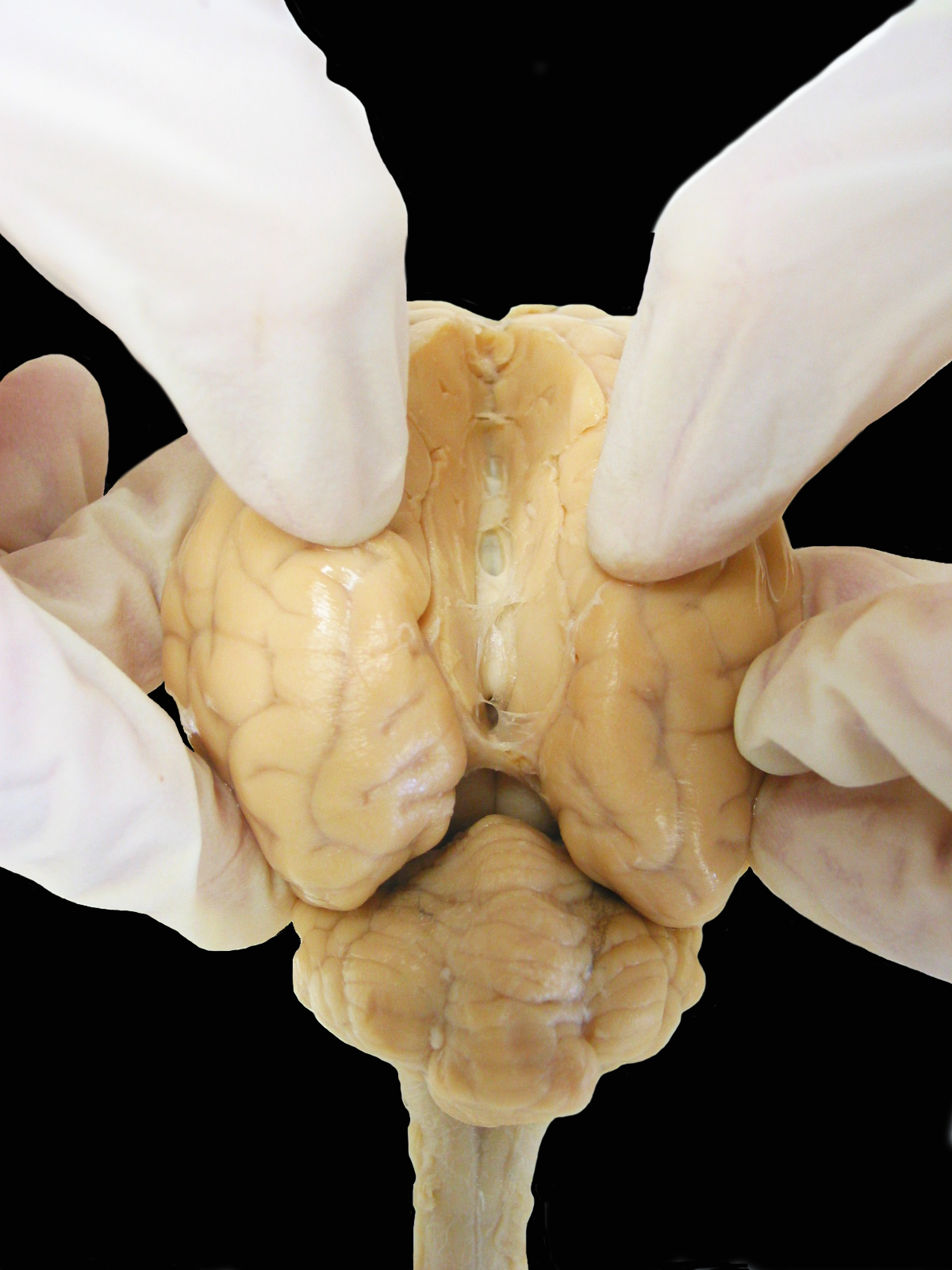
A dissected sheep brain

Neuroscientists focus primarily on the study and research of the nervous system. The nervous system is composed of the brain, spinal cord and nerve cells. Studies of the nervous system may focus on the cellular level, as in studies of the ion channels, or instead may focus on a systemic level as in behavioural or cognitive studies. A significant portion of nervous system studies is devoted to understanding the diseases that affect the nervous system, like multiple sclerosis, Alzheimer's, Parkinson's, and Lou Gehrig's. Research commonly occurs in private, government and public research institutions and universities.

Some common tasks for neuroscientists are:

- Developing experiments and leading groups of people in supporting roles
- Conducting theoretical and computational neuronal data analysis
- Research and development of new treatments for neurological disorders
- Working with doctors to perform experimental studies of new drugs on willing patients
- Following safety and sanitation procedures and guidelines
- Dissecting experimental specimens

=== Salary ===
The overall median salary for neuroscientists in the United States was $79,940 in May 2014. Neuroscientists are usually full-time employees. Median salaries at common work places in the United States are shown below.

Common Work Places	Median Annual Pay
Colleges and universities	$58,140
Hospitals	$73,590
Laboratories	$82,700
Research and Development	$90,200
Pharmaceutical	$150,000

=== Work environment ===
Neuroscientists research and study both the biological and psychological aspects of the nervous system. Once neuroscientists finish their post doctoral programs, 39% go on to perform more doctoral work, while 36% take on faculty jobs. Neuroscientists use a wide range of mathematical methods, computer programs, biochemical approaches and imaging techniques such as magnetic resonance imaging, computed tomography angiography, and diffusion tensor imaging. Imaging techniques allow scientists to observe physical changes in the brain and spinal cord, as signals occur. Neuroscientists can also be part of several different neuroscience organizations where they can publish and read different research topics.

=== Job outlook ===
Neuroscience is expecting job growth of about 8% from 2014 to 2024, a considerably greater than average job growth rate when compared to other professions. Factors leading to this growth include an aging population, new discoveries leading to new areas of research, and increasing utilization of medications. Government funding for research will also continue to influence the demand for this specialty.

=== Education ===
Neuroscientists typically enroll in a four-year undergraduate program and then move on to a PhD program for graduate studies. Once finished with their graduate studies, neuroscientists may continue doing postdoctoral work to gain more lab experience and explore new laboratory methods. In their undergraduate years, neuroscientists typically take physical and life science courses to gain a foundation in the field of research. Typical undergraduate majors include biology, behavioral neuroscience, and cognitive neuroscience.

Many colleges and universities now have PhD training programs in the neurosciences, often with divisions between cognitive, cellular and molecular, computational and systems neuroscience.

=== Interdisciplinary fields ===
Neuroscience has a unique perspective in that it can be applied in a broad range of disciplines, and thus the fields neuroscientists work in vary. Neuroscientists may study topics from the large hemispheres of the brain to neurotransmitters and synapses occurring in neurons at a micro-level. Some fields that combine psychology and neurobiology include cognitive neuroscience, and behavioural neuroscience. Cognitive neuroscientists study human consciousness, specifically the brain, and how it can be seen through a lens of biochemical and biophysical processes. Behavioral neuroscience encompasses the whole nervous system, environment and the brain how these areas show us aspects of motivation, learning, and motor skills along with many others. Computational neuroscience uses mathematical models to understand how the brain processes information.

== History ==
=== Egyptian understanding and early Greeks ===
Hieroglyphic stating the word, "brain", dated to 1700 BC. This work is considered a copy of an original writing as old as 3000 BC.

Some of the first writings about the brain come from the Egyptians. In about 3000 BC the first known written description of the brain also indicated that the location of brain injuries may be related to specific symptoms. This document contrasted common theory at the time. Most of the Egyptians' other writings are very spiritual, describing thought and feelings as responsibilities of the heart. This idea was widely accepted and can be found into 17th century Europe.

Plato believed that the brain was the locus of mental processes. However, Aristotle believed instead the heart to be the source of mental processes and that the brain acted as a cooling system for the cardiovascular system.

Galen described the seven cranial nerves' functions along with giving a foundational understanding of the spinal cord. He believed that sensory sensation was caused in the middle of the brain, while the motor sensations were produced in the anterior portion of the brain. Galen imparted some ideas on mental health disorders and what caused these disorders to arise. He believed that the cause was backed-up black bile, and that epilepsy was caused by phlegm. Galen's observations on neuroscience were not challenged for many years.

=== Medieval European beliefs and Andreas Vesalius ===
Medieval beliefs generally held true the proposals of Galen, including the attribution of mental processes to specific ventricles in the brain. Functions of regions of the brain were defined based on their texture and composition: memory function was attributed to the posterior ventricle, a harder region of the brain and thus a good place for memory storage.

Andreas Vesalius redirected the study of neuroscience away from the anatomical focus; he considered the attribution of functions based on location to be crude. Pushing away from the superficial proposals made by Galen and medieval beliefs, Vesalius did not believe that studying anatomy would lead to any significant advances in the understanding of thinking and the brain.

== Current and developing research topics ==
Research in neuroscience is expanding and becoming increasingly interdisciplinary. Many current research projects involve the integration of computer programs in mapping the human nervous system. The National Institutes of Health (NIH) sponsored Human Connectome Project, launched in 2009, hopes to establish a highly detailed map of the human nervous system and its millions of connections. Detailed neural mapping could lead the way for advances in the diagnosis and treatment of neurological disorders.

Neuroscientists are also at work studying epigenetics, the study of how certain factors that we face in our everyday lives not only affect us and our genes but also how they will affect our children and change their genes to adapt to the environments we faced.

=== Behavioral and developmental studies ===
Neuroscientists have been working to show how the brain is far more elastic and able to change than we once thought. They have been using work that psychologists previously reported to show how the observations work, and give a model for it.

L-phenylalanine

One recent behavioral study is that of phenylketonuria (PKU), a disorder that heavily damages the brain due to toxic levels of the amino acid phenylalanine. Before neuroscientists had studied this disorder, psychologists did not have a mechanistic understanding as to how this disorder caused high levels of the amino acid and thus treatment was not well understood, and oftentimes, was inadequate. The neuroscientists that studied this disorder used the previous observations of psychologists to propose a mechanistic model that gave a better understanding of the disorder at the molecular level. This in turn led to better understanding of the disorder as a whole and greatly changed treatment that led to better lives for patients with the disorder.

Another recent study was that of mirror neurons, neurons that fire when mimicking or observing another animal or person that is making some sort of expression, movement, or gesture. This study was again one where neuroscientists used the observations of psychologists to create a model for how the observation worked. The initial observation was that newborn infants mimicked facial expressions that were expressed to them. Scientists were not certain that newborn infants were developed enough to have complex neurons that allowed them to mimic different people and there was something else that allowed them to mimic expressions. Neuroscientists then provided a model for what was occurring and concluded that infants did in fact have these neurons that fired when watching and mimicking facial expressions.

=== Effects of early experience on the brain ===
Neuroscientists have also studied the effects of "nurture" on the developing brain. Saul Schanberg and other neuroscientists did a study on how important nurturing touch is to the developing brains in rats. They found that the rats who were deprived of nurture from the mother for just one hour had reduced functions in processes like DNA synthesis and hormone secretion.

Michael Meaney and his colleagues found that the offspring of mother rats who provided significant nurture and attention tended to show less fear, responded more positively to stress, and functioned at higher levels and for longer times when fully mature. They also found that the rats who were given much attention as adolescents also gave their offspring the same amount of attention and thus showed that rats raised their offspring similar to how they were raised. These studies were also seen on a microscopic level where different genes were expressed for the rats that were given high amounts of nurture and those same genes were not expressed in the rats who received less attention.

The effects of nurture and touch were not only studied in rats, but also in newborn humans. Many neuroscientists have performed studies where the importance of touch is shown in newborn humans. The same results that were shown in rats, also held true for humans. Babies that received less touch and nurture developed slower than babies that received a lot of attention and nurture. Stress levels were also lower in babies that were nurtured regularly and cognitive development was also higher due to increased touch. Human offspring, much like rat offspring, thrive off of nurture, as shown by the various studies of neuroscientists.

== Famous neuroscientists ==
=== Neuroscientists awarded Nobel Prizes in physiology or medicine ===
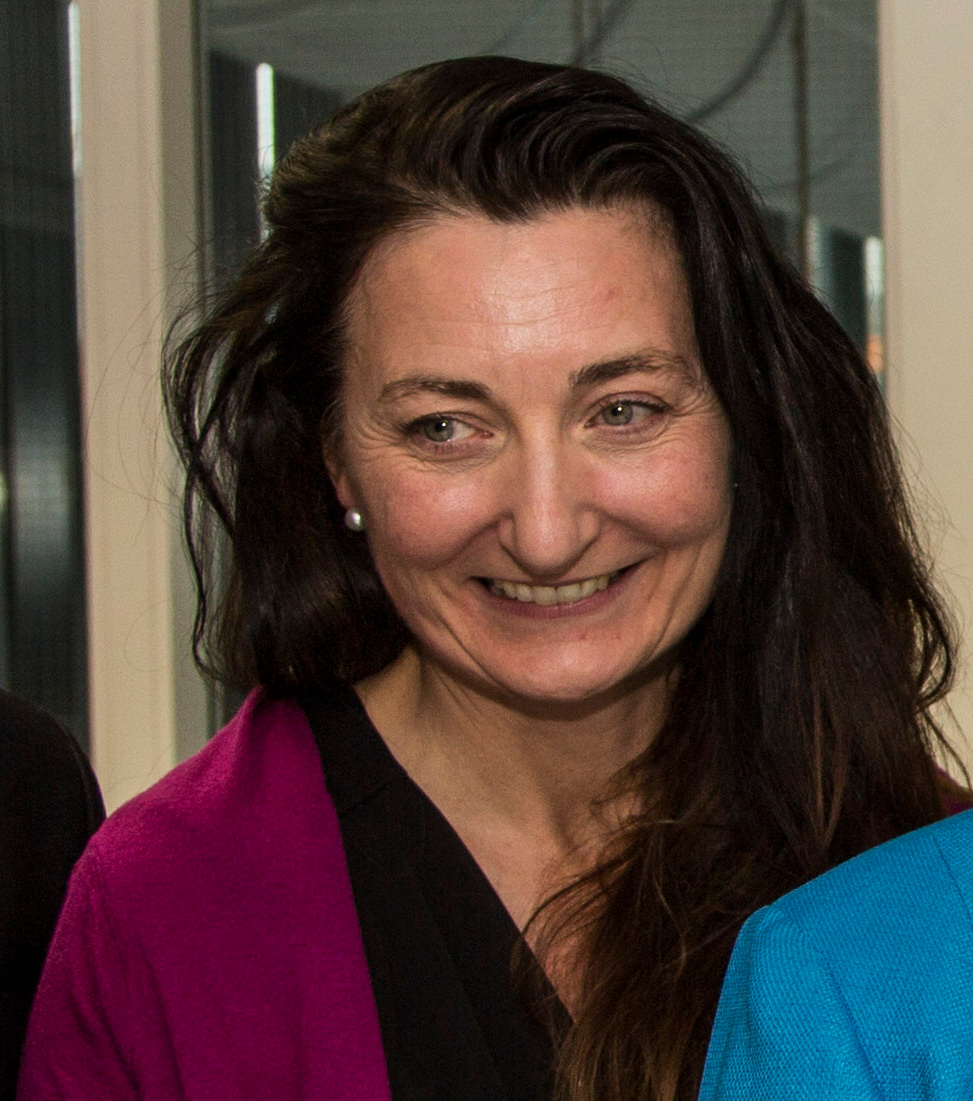
- May-Britt Moser, co-winner of 2014 Nobel Prize in Physiology or Medicine
  Thomas C. Südhof (2013) for the discovery of the precise neurotransmitters release control system.

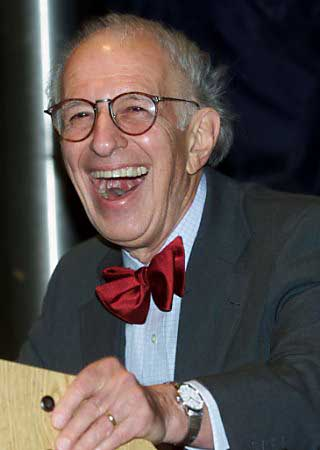
Eric Kandel, co-winner of the 2000 Nobel Prize in Physiology or Medicine

- Camillo Golgi and Santiago Ramón y Cajal (1906) for the development of the silver staining method, revealing what would later be determined as individual neurons. Cajal's interpretations of the images produced by Golgi's staining technique led to the adoption of the neuron doctrine.
- Charles Sherrington and Edgar Adrian (1932) for their discoveries of the general function of neurons, including excitatory and inhibitory signals, and the all-or-nothing response of nerve fibers.
- Sir Henry Dale and Otto Loewi (1936) for the discovery of neurotransmitters and identification of acetylcholine.
- Joseph Erlanger and Herbert Gasser (1944) for discoveries illustrating the varied timing exhibited by single nerve fibers.
- Walter Rudolf Hess and António Caetano Egas Moniz (1949) for discovery of the functional organization of the midbrain and for the controversial therapeutic value of leucotomy respectively.
- Alan Hodgkin, Andrew Huxley, and Sir John Eccles (1963) for discovering the ionic basis of the action potential and macroscopic currents through their use of the squid giant axon.
- Sir Bernard Katz, Ulf von Euler and Julius Axelrod (1970) for the discovery of the mechanisms responsible for neurotransmitter storage, release, and inactivation. Their work included the discovery of the synaptic vesicle and quantal neurotransmitter release.
- Roger Guillemin and Andrew V. Schally (1977) for discovering the production on the brain of the peptide hormone.
- Roger W. Sperry, David H. Hubel and Torsten N. Wiesel (1981) for discoveries concerning the cerebral hemispheres specialization and the visual system respectively.
- Stanley Cohen and Rita Levi-Montalcini (1986) for their discovery of nerve growth factor (NGF) as well as epidermal growth factor (EGF).
- Erwin Neher and Bert Sakmann (1991) for the development of the patch-clamp recording technique, allowing, for the first time, the observation of current flow through individual ion channels. Neher and Sakmann additionally characterized the specificity of ion channels.
- Arvid Carlsson, Paul Greengard and Eric Kandel (2000) for the discovery of neural signal transduction pathways upon neurotransmitter binding, as well as the establishment of dopamine as a primary acting neurotransmitter.
- Richard Axel and Linda B. Buck (2004) for their discoveries concerning the olfactory system
- John O'Keefe, Edvard I. Moser and May-Britt Moser (2014) for their discoveries of cells that constitute a positioning system in the brain.
- Jeffrey C. Hall, Michael Rosbash and Michael W, Young (2017) "for their discoveries of molecular mechanisms controlling the circadian rhythm"

=== Neuroscientists in popular culture ===
- Victor Frankenstein, title character of Mary Shelley's 1818 novel Frankenstein; or, The Modern Prometheus
- Amy Farrah Fowler, Ph.D, main character in CBS's The Big Bang Theory. She is played by Mayim Bialik, who also holds a Ph.D. in neuroscience.
- Dr. Cameron Goodkin, main character in Stitchers. Before his work at the NSA, he was a researcher at MIT.

== See also ==
- List of neuroscientists
- List of women neuroscientists
- International Brain Research Organization
- Society for Neuroscience
