= D. Kent Morest =

American educator and researcher (1934–2020)

- Born: October 4, 1934; Kansas City, Missouri, U.S.
- Died: December 30, 2020 (aged 86); Arlington, Massachusetts, U.S.
- Education: University of Chicago; Yale University
- Scientific career
- Fields: Neuroscience; Anatomy
- Workplaces: National Institutes of Health; University of Chicago; Harvard Medical School; University of Connecticut

Donald Kent Morest (October 4, 1934 – December 30, 2020) was an American educator and researcher. He is regarded as "the father of modern neuroanatomy of the auditory system.". His unconventional use of Golgi methods to study the neuroanatomy of the auditory nervous system in humans and mammals laid the foundation for investigations into central auditory signal processing. Other notable research interests included developmental neurobiology, and the processes related to hearing loss induced by exposure to loud noises.

== Early life and education ==
Morest was born in Kansas City, Missouri on October 4, 1934. He graduated with honors from the University of Chicago in 1955. As a medical school student, he was a fellow at the Montreal Neurological Institute, a Brown Student Fellow at Yale, and a Foreign Fellow of Yale at University College London. He received his M.D. with honors from Yale University in 1960.

== Professional career ==
Morest is best known for his usage of Golgi's method and detail-oriented microscopy work throughout his research career, which led to the uncovering of important advances in understanding neural structure and function. Rather than using the traditional method of presenting the cells treated with Golgi techniques as opaque blobs on a neutral background, he took the unconventional step of including illustrations of the textures, dimensions, and surfaces of the cells in his studies, which he believed allowed for a richer understanding of the microscopist’s experience. He spearheaded the advancement of neuroscience (particularly auditory neuroscience) at the University of Connecticut Health Center (UCHC). He also founded the High Tech Center at UCHC. Morest was vital to the creation of the neuroscience doctoral program as well as the Department of Neuroscience at the University of Connecticut.

== Personal life and death ==
In 1963, Morest married lab technician Rosemary Richtmyer. They had two children, Lydia and Claude.

Morest died in Arlington, Massachusetts on December 30, 2020, at the age of 86.

=== Timeline ===
- 1955 A.B. University of Chicago
- 1960 M.D. Yale University
- 1960-1963 Senior Assistant Surgeon, Neuroanatomical Sciences, NIH
- 1963-1965 Assistant Professor of Anatomy, University of Chicago
- 1965-1977 Assistant, Associate Professor, Anatomy Department, Harvard Medical School
- 1977-2000 Professor of Anatomy, University of Connecticut
- 2000-2012 Professor of Neuroscience, University of Connecticut (retirement)

=== Awards ===
- The Charles Judson Herrick Award for Meritorious Contributions to Comparative Neurology, 1966, American Association of Anatomists.
- Charles N. Loeser Award for Excellence in Teaching in the Basic Medical Sciences, The University of Connecticut Health Center, 1981.
- Jacob Javits Neuroscience Investigator Award, 1984, NINDS, NIH.
- Claude Pepper Award, 1990, NIDCD, NIH.
- Professional Achievement Award, 2009, University of Chicago Alumni, University of Chicago.

== Publications ==
Morest authored, co-authored and edited a number of books and articles.

=== Selected papers ===
- Hossain WA, D'Sa C, Morest DK (August 2006). "Site-specific interactions of neurotrophin-3 and fibroblast growth factor (FGF2) in the embryonic development of the mouse cochlear nucleus". Journal of Neurobiology. 66 (9): 897–915. doi:10.1002/neu.20264. PMID 16673387.
- Feng JJ, Morest DK (2006). "Development of synapses and expression of a voltage-gated potassium channel in chick embryonic auditory nuclei". Hearing Research. 216–217: 116–26. doi:10.1016/j.heares.2006.01.012. PMID 16530363. S2CID 10157115.
- Hossain WA, Antic SD, Yang Y, Rasband MN, Morest DK (July 2005). "Where is the spike generator of the cochlear nerve? Voltage-gated sodium channels in the mouse cochlea". The Journal of Neuroscience. 25 (29): 6857–68. doi:10.1523/JNEUROSCI.0123-05.2005. PMC 1378182. PMID 16033895.
- Kim JJ, Gross J, Potashner SJ, Morest DK (September 2004). "Fine structure of degeneration in the cochlear nucleus of the chinchilla after acoustic overstimulation". Journal of Neuroscience Research. 77 (6): 798–816. doi:10.1002/jnr.20213. PMID 15334599. S2CID 22080192.
- Morest DK, Cotanche DA (November 2004). "Regeneration of the inner ear as a model of neural plasticity". Journal of Neuroscience Research. 78 (4): 455–60. doi:10.1002/jnr.20283. PMID 15468175. S2CID 22637779.
- Josephson EM, Morest DK (July 2003). "Synaptic nests lack glutamate transporters in the cochlear nucleus of the mouse". Synapse. 49 (1): 29–46. doi:10.1002/syn.10201. PMID 12710013. S2CID 21796148.
- Morest DK, Silver J (July 2003). "Precursors of neurons, neuroglia, and ependymal cells in the CNS: what are they? Where are they from? How do they get where they are going?". Glia. 43 (1): 6–18. doi:10.1002/glia.10238. PMID 12761861.
- Hossain WA, Brumwell CL, Morest DK (May 2002). "Sequential interactions of fibroblast growth factor-2, brain-derived neurotrophic factor, neurotrophin-3, and their receptors define critical periods in the development of cochlear ganglion cells". Experimental Neurology. 175 (1): 138–51. doi:10.1006/exnr.2002.7872. PMID 12009766. S2CID 26968602.
- Smith L, Gross J, Morest DK (July 2002). "Fibroblast growth factors (FGFs) in the cochlear nucleus of the adult mouse following acoustic overstimulation". Hearing Research. 169 (1–2): 1–12. doi:10.1016/S0378-5955(02)00461-6. PMID 12121735. S2CID 206079729.
- Bilak MM, Hossain WA, Morest DK (March 2003). "Intracellular fibroblast growth factor produces effects different from those of extracellular application on development of avian cochleovestibular ganglion cells in vitro". Journal of Neuroscience Research. 71 (5): 629–47. doi:10.1002/jnr.10498. PMID 12584722. S2CID 29996723.

=== Books ===
- Morest, D. Kent; Winer, Jeffery A. (1986). The Comparative Anatomy of Neurons: Homologous Neurons in the Medial Geniculate Body of the Opossum and the Cat. Advances in Anatomy, Embryology, and Cell Biology. Springer. ISBN 978-3-642-70652-3.
- Roberts, Melville; Hanaway, Joseph; Morest, D Kent (1987). Atlas of the Human Brain in Section. Lea & Febiger. ISBN 978-0-8121-1030-2.
