= Reticular theory =

Obsolete scientific theory in neurobiology

Reticular theory is an obsolete scientific theory in neurobiology that stated that everything in the nervous system, such as the brain, is a single continuous network. The concept was postulated by a German anatomist Joseph von Gerlach in 1871, and was most popularised by the Nobel laureate Italian physician Camillo Golgi.

However, the theory was refuted by later observations of Spanish pathologist Santiago Ramón y Cajal, using a staining technique discovered by Golgi, which showed that nervous tissue, like other tissues, is made of discrete cells. This neuron doctrine turned out to be the correct description of the nervous system, whereas the reticular theory was discredited.

The proponents of the two contrasting theories, Golgi and Ramón y Cajal were jointly awarded the Nobel Prize in Physiology or Medicine in 1906, "in recognition of their work on the structure of the nervous system".

== Development ==
In 1863 a German anatomist Otto Friedrich Karl Deiters described the existence of an unbranched tubular process (the axon) extending from some cells in the central nervous system, specifically from the lateral vestibular nucleus. In 1871 Gerlach proposed that the brain is composed of "protoplasmic network", hence the basis of reticular theory. According to Gerlach, the nervous system simply consisted of a single continuous network called the reticulum. In 1873 Golgi invented a revolutionary method for microscopic research based on a specific technique for staining nerve cells, which he called "la reazione nera" (the "black reaction"). He was able to provide an intricate description of nerve cells in various regions of the cerebro-spinal axis, clearly distinguishing the axon from the dendrites. He drew up a new classification of cells on the basis of the structure of their nervous prolongation, and he criticized Gerlach's theory of the "protoplasmic network". Golgi claimed to observe in the gray matter an extremely dense and intricate network, composed of a web of intertwined branches of axons coming from different cell layers ("diffuse nervous network"). This structure, which emerges from the axons and is therefore essentially different from that hypothesized by Gerlach, appeared in his view to be the main organ of the nervous system, the organ that connected different cerebral areas both anatomically and functionally by means of the transmission of an electric nervous impulse. Although Golgi's earlier works between 1873 and 1885 clearly depicted the axonal connections of cerebellar cortex and olfactory bulb as independent of one another, his later works including the Nobel Lecture showed the entire granular layer of the cerebellar cortex occupied by a network of branching and anastomosing nerve processes. This was due to his strong conviction in the reticular theory.

== Decline ==
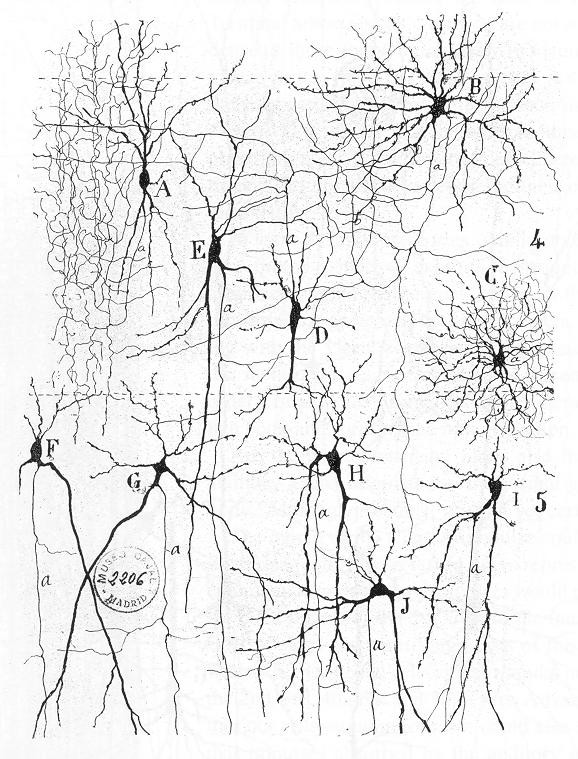
Ramón y Cajal's illustration of the neuronal morphologies in the auditory cortex

In 1877 an English physiologist Edward Schäfer described the absence of connections between the nerve elements in the mantles of the jellyfish. The Norwegian zoologist Fridtjof Nansen also reported in 1887 that he found no connections between the processes of the ganglion cells of aquatic animals in his doctoral research (The Structure and Combination of Histological Elements of the Central Nervous System). By the late 1880s, serious opposition to the reticular theory began to emerge. Wilhelm His in Leipzig studied the embryological development of the central nervous system and concluded that his observations were consistent with the classic cell theory (that nerve cells were individual cells), and not the reticular theory. In 1891, another German anatomist Wilhelm Waldeyer also supported the theory by stating that the nervous system, as other tissues, was composed of cells, which he named "neurons." Using the very same Golgi's technique, Ramón y Cajal confirmed that discrete neurons did exist, thereby strengthening the concept of the growing neuron doctrine. Golgi, however, never accepted these new findings, and a controversy and rivalry between the two scientists lasted even after they were jointly awarded the Nobel Prize in 1906. The Nobel award is even dubbed as creating the "storm center of histological controversy". Ramón y Cajal even commented that: "What a cruel irony of fate to pair, like Siamese twins united by the shoulders, scientific adversaries of such contrasting character!".

In the 1950s electron microscopy finally confirmed the existence of individual neurons in the central nervous system, and the existence of gaps in between neurons called synapses. The reticular theory was finally put to rest.
