= Heinrich Wilhelm Gottfried von Waldeyer-Hartz =

German neuroscientist (1836–1921)

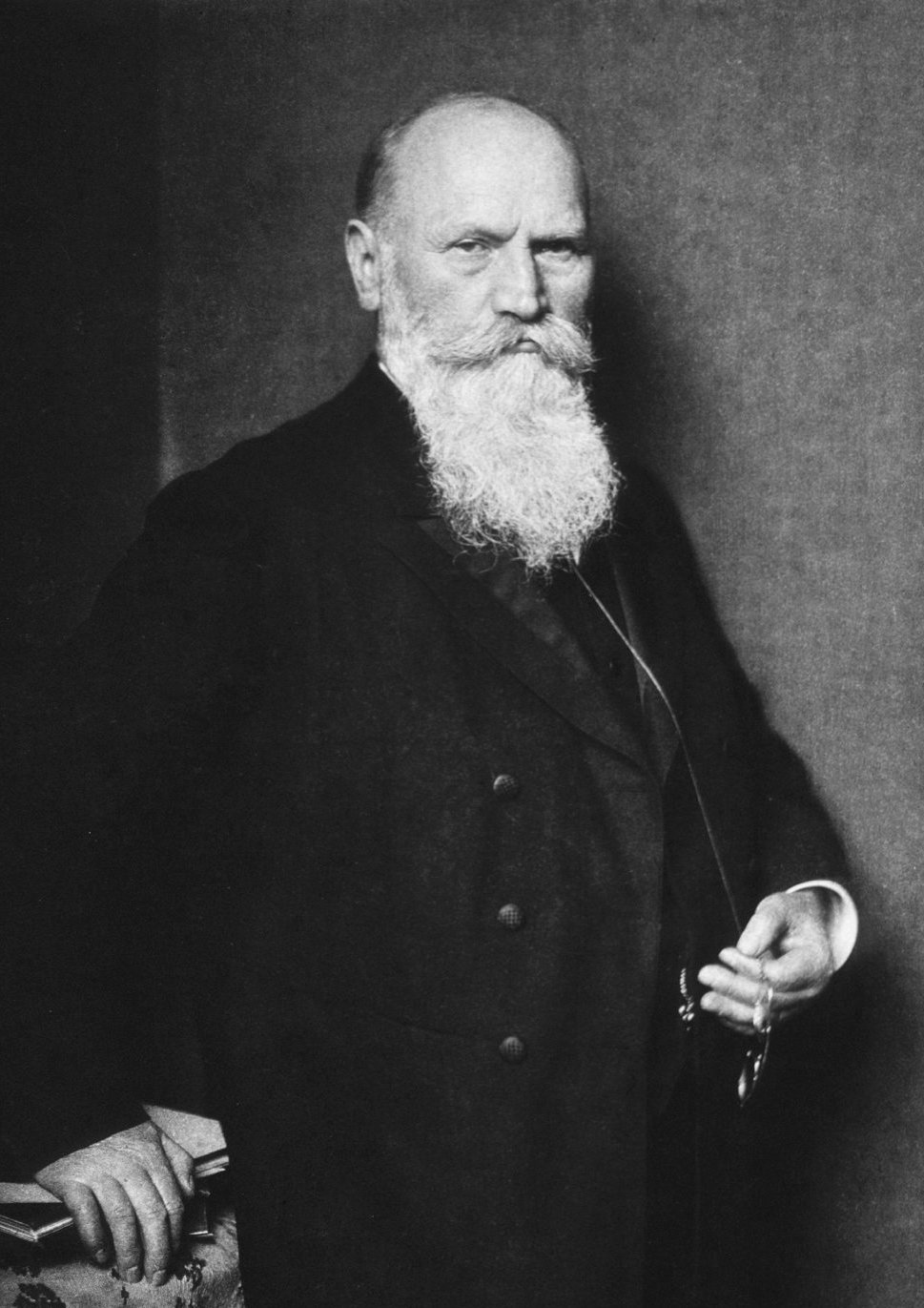
- Born: 6 October 1836; Hehlen an der Weser, Duchy of Brunswick, German Confederation
- Died: 23 January 1921 (aged 84); Berlin, Germany
- Known for: consolidating the neuron theory, Naming the chromosome
- Scientific career
- Fields: Anatomy, Histology and Pathology
- Workplaces: Center for Anatomy of the Charité 1883–1917

Heinrich Wilhelm Gottfried von Waldeyer-Hartz (6 October 1836 – 23 January 1921) was a German anatomist, known for summarizing the neuron theory and for naming the chromosome. He is also remembered by anatomical structures of the human body which were named after him: Waldeyer's tonsillar ring (the lymphoid tissue ring of the naso- and oropharynx) and Waldeyer's glands (of the eyelids).

== Contribution to neuron theory ==
Waldeyer's name is associated in neuroscience with the "neuron theory", and for coining the term "neuron" to describe the basic structural unit of the nervous system. Waldeyer synthesized the discoveries by neuroanatomists (and later Nobel Prize winners) Camillo Golgi (1843–1926) and Santiago Ramón y Cajal (1852–1934), who had used the silver nitrate method of staining nerve tissue (Golgi's method), to formulate widely cited reviews of the theory. Waldeyer learned Spanish in order to absorb Cajal's detailed studies using Golgi's method and became his friend, mentor and promoter in the German-dominated field of microscopic anatomy. The theory was published in a series of papers in the main medical journal of Germany, Deutsche Medizinische Wochenschrift, which became extremely influential. However, as Cajal points out, though Waldeyer "supported the theory with the prestige of his authority, he did not contribute a single personal observation. He limited himself to a short brilliant exposition of the objective proofs, adduced by His, Kölliker, Retzius, van Gehuchten and myself, and he invented the fortunate term neuron."

== Cytology and embryology ==
Waldeyer also studied the basophilic stained filaments which had been found to be the main constituents of chromatin, the material inside the cell nucleus, by his colleague of Kiel, Walther Flemming (1843–1905). Although its significance for genetics and for cell biology was still to be discovered, these filaments were known to be involved in the phenomenon of cell division discovered by Flemming, named mitosis, as well as in meiosis. He coined in 1888 the term "chromosome" to describe them.

Among his many other anatomical and embryological studies, Waldeyer became known for his pioneering research on the development of teeth and hair, many of the terms he invented are still in use today. He also published the first embryological, anatomical and functional studies about the naso-oro-pharyngeal lymphatic tissue, which was named after him.

In 1904, he was elected as a member to the American Philosophical Society.

== Bibliography ==
- Über Karyokinese und ihre Beziehungen zu den Befruchtungsvorgängen. Archiv für mikroskopische Anatomie und Entwicklungsmechanik, 1888, 32: 1–122. Paper about mitosis and chromosomes.
- Ueber einige neuere Forschungen im Gebiete der Anatomie des Centralnervensystems. Deutsche medicinische Wochenschrift, Berlin, 1891: 17: 1213–1218, 1244–1246, 1287–1289, 1331–1332, 1350–1356. (About some new researches in the field of anatomy of the central nervous system). His most famous statement and summary of the neuron theory.
- W. von Waldeyer-Hartz: Lebenserinnerungen. Bonn, 1920; 2nd edition; Bonn, 1921; 3rd edition, 1922. His memoirs.
