= Corteno Golgi =

Village in Lombardy, Italy

Corteno Golgi Còrten
- Comune
- Comune di Corteno Golgi
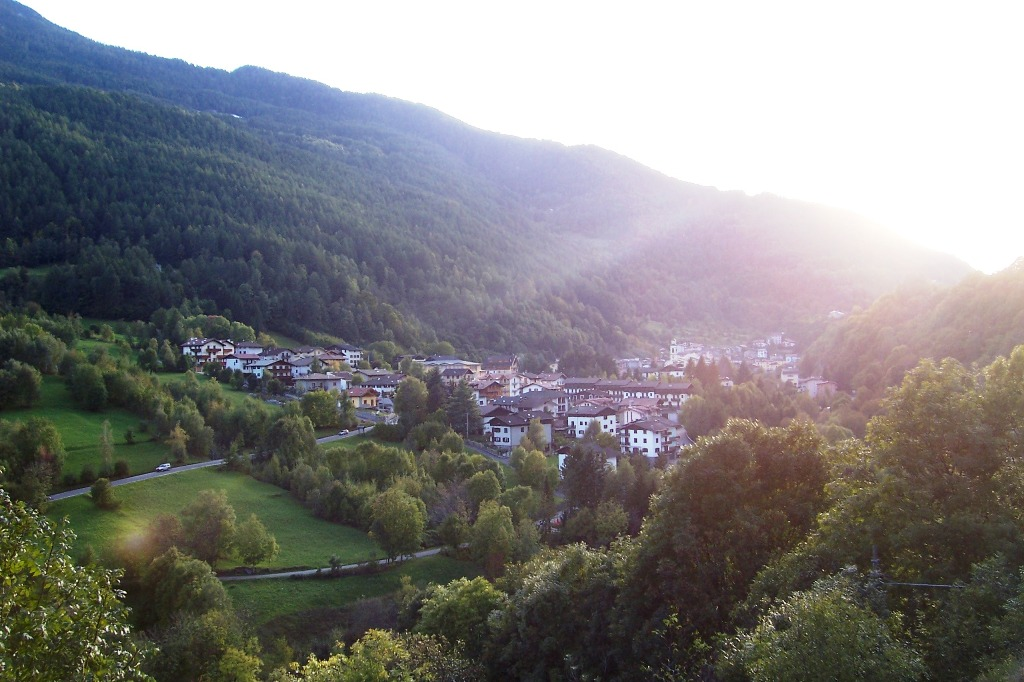

- Coat of arms

- Location within Italy Location within Lombardy
- Coordinates: 46°10′1″N 10°14′40″E
- Country: Italy
- Region: Lombardy
- Province: Brescia (BS)
- Frazioni: Galleno, Doverio, Lombro, Megno, Ronco, San Pietro in Aprica, Sant'Antonio, Santicolo

Government
  - Mayor: Giuseppino Lippi

Area
  - Total: 82.61 km^{2} (31.90 sq mi)
- Elevation: 925 m (3,035 ft)

Population (30 June 2017)
  - Total: 1,957
  - Density: 23.69/km^{2} (61.36/sq mi)
- Demonym: Cortenesi
- Time zone: UTC+1 (CET)
  - Summer (DST): UTC+2 (CEST)
- Postal code: 25040
- Dialing code: 0364
- Website: Official website

Corteno Golgi (Italian: [ˈkorteno ˈɡɔldʒi]; Camunian: Còrten [ˈkɔrtɛn]) is an Italian village and comune (municipality) in the Val Camonica area of central Alps in northern Italy, administratively in the province of Brescia, Lombardy.

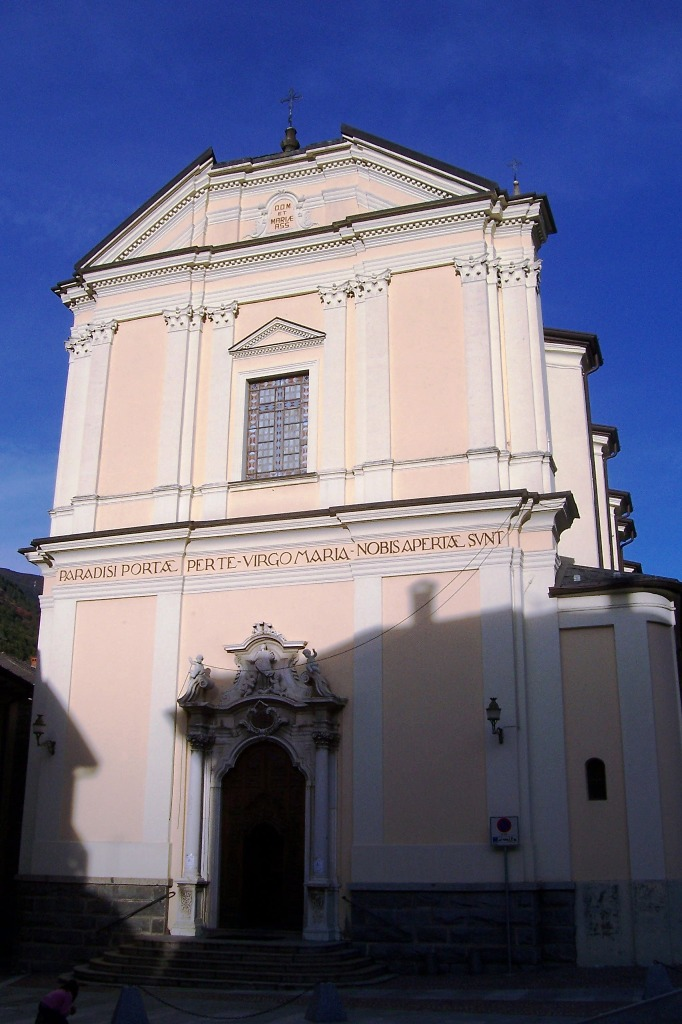
Parish church of Corteno Golgi

Formerly known as simply Corteno, the name of the village was changed in 1956 after the memory of scientist Camillo Golgi, who was born there in 1843 and was the first Italian to be awarded with the Nobel Prize in Physiology or Medicine in 1906. The town houses a museum dedicated to his work.

== Twin towns ==
Corteno Golgi is twinned with:

- Petilla de Aragón, Spain
