= Antonio Pensa =

Italian biologist (1874–1970)

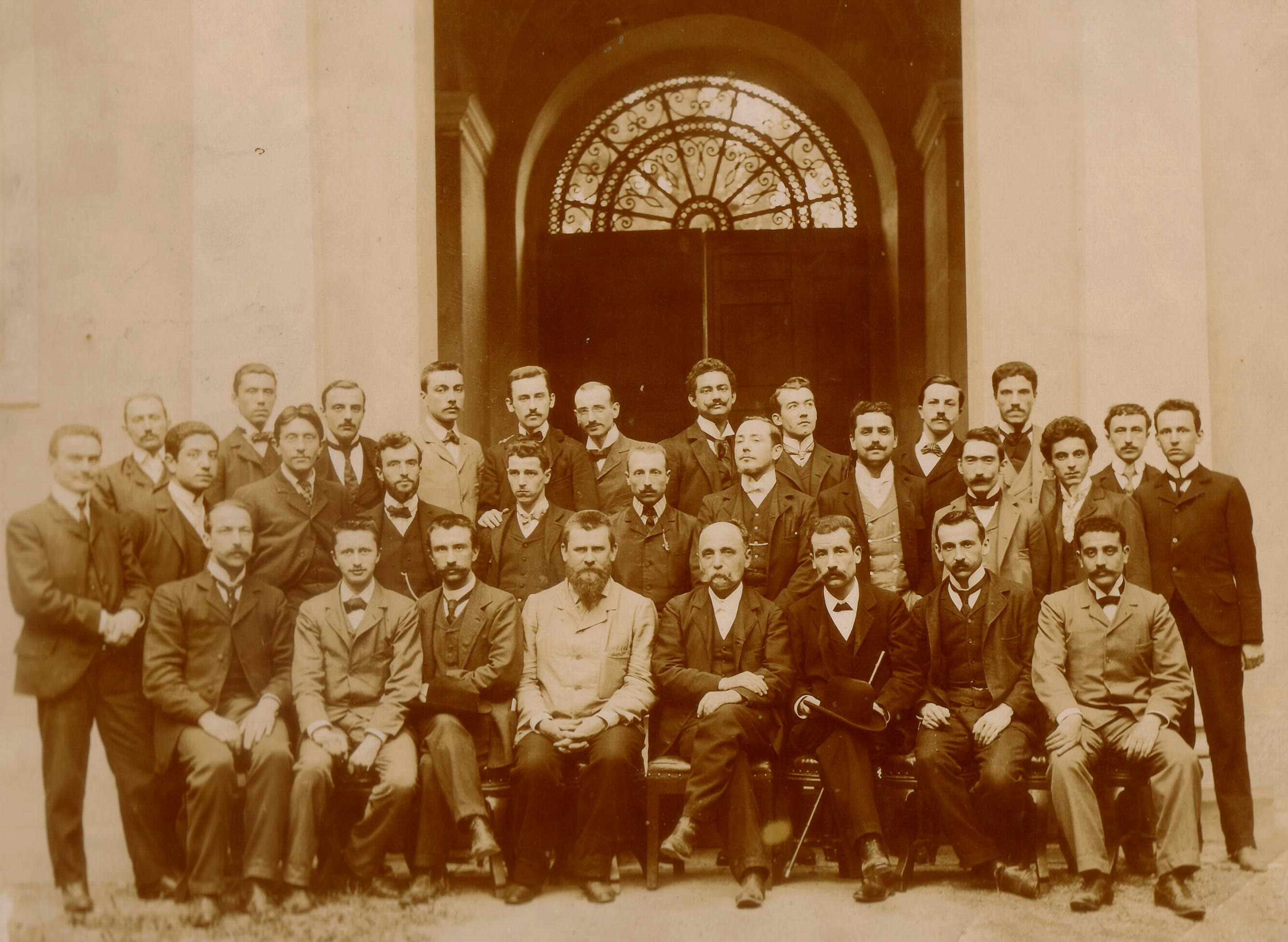
Antonio Pensa (seated second from left) with Golgi (sitting fifth from left) and others at the University of Pavia, c. 1900

Antonio Pensa (15 September 1874 – 17 August 1970) was an Italian physician, anatomist and embryologist. A student of Camillo Golgi, he continued work on Golgi's lines of research on cellular structure.

Pensa was born in Milan to Michele and Giuseppina Calzini, attended the Longone boarding school and the Parini high school in Milan in 1892 before going to study medicine at the University of Pavia. He received a doctorate in 1898, becoming a student of Golgi. He then lectured in anatomy from 1900 and became a professor in 1915 at Sassari, moving to Parma in 1921 before moving to Pavia in 1930. In 1918, during the outbreak of the Spanish flu, he was involved in setting up an isolation unit in Pavia. In 1950 he was director of the centre for neuroanatomy. An expert on histological techniques, he trained a generation of scientists including the neurophysiologist Giuseppe Moruzzi. Pensa demonstrated in 1899 the presence of the Golgi apparatus and endoplasmic reticulum in cells of the adrenal medulla as it had not been seen other than in nerve cells, where Golgi had first observed them. In 1910, he described the Golgi apparatus in plant cells. He described the myoid elements of the thymus in birds, amphibians and reptiles. He produced a treatise on histology in 1926 where he expanded on the findings of Golgi and Ramón y Cajal. Pensa also established the museum at the University of Pavia which he directed from 1938 until his death. A marble bust of Pensa now stands at the Anatomical Theatre at the University of Pavia.
