= Santiago Ramón y Cajal =

Spanish neuroscientist (1852–1934)

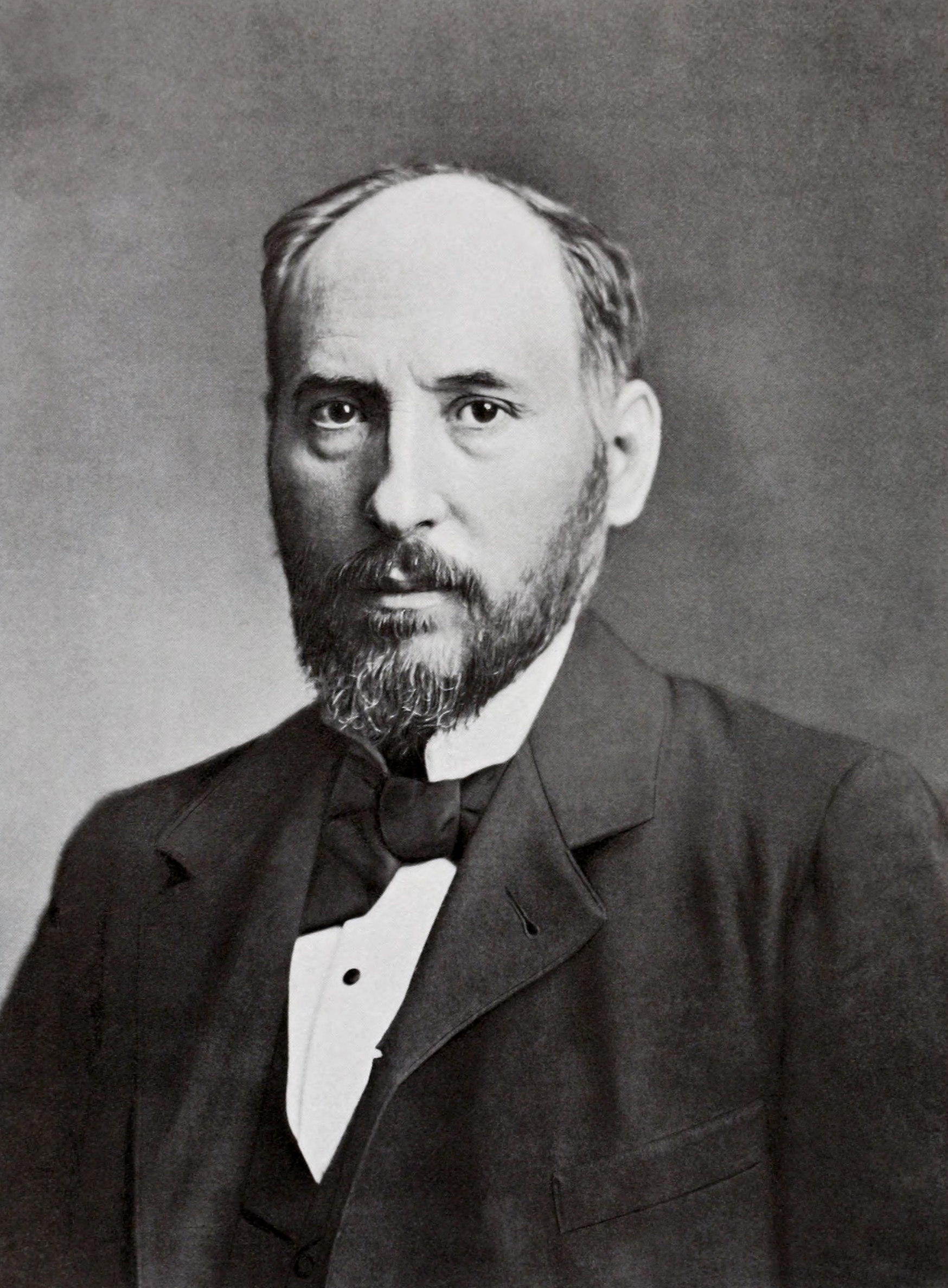
- Ramón y Cajal in 1899.
- Born: 1 May 1852; Petilla de Aragón, Spain
- Died: 17 October 1934 (aged 82); Madrid, Spain
- Education: University of Zaragoza
- Known for: Fathering modern neuroscience Discovery of the neuron Cajal body, Cajal–Retzius cell, Interstitial cell of Cajal, Neuron doctrine, Growth cone, Dendritic spine, Long-term potentiation, Mossy fiber, Neurotrophic theory, Axo-axonic synapse, Pioneer axon, Pyramidal cell, Radial glial cell, Retinal ganglion cell, Trisynaptic circuit, Visual map theory
- Awards: Nobel Prize in Physiology or Medicine (1906)
- Scientific career
- Fields: Neuroscience; Pathology; Histology
- Workplaces: University of Valencia; Complutense University of Madrid; University of Barcelona

Santiago Ramón y Cajal (Spanish: [sanˈtjaɣo raˈmon i kaˈxal]; 1 May 1852 – 17 October 1934) was a Spanish neuroscientist, pathologist, and histologist specialising in neuroanatomy, and the central nervous system. He and Camillo Golgi received the Nobel Prize in Physiology or Medicine in 1906. Ramón y Cajal was the first Spaniard to win a scientific Nobel Prize. His original investigations of the microscopic structure of the brain made him a pioneer of modern neuroscience.

Hundreds of his drawings illustrating the arborization (tree-like growth) of brain cells are still in use, since the mid-20th century, for educational and training purposes.

== Biography ==
Santiago Ramón y Cajal was born on 1 May 1852, in the town of Petilla de Aragón, Navarre, Spain. As a child, he was transferred many times from one school to another because of behavior that was declared poor, rebellious, and anti-authoritarian. An extreme example of his precociousness and rebelliousness at the age of eleven is his 1863 imprisonment for destroying his neighbor's yard gate with a homemade cannon. He was a keen painter, artist, and gymnast, but his father neither appreciated nor encouraged these abilities, even though these artistic talents would contribute to his success later in life. His father apprenticed him to a shoemaker and barber, to "try and give his son much-needed discipline and stability."

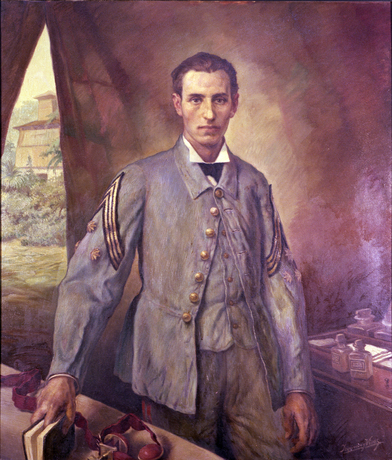
Ramón y Cajal, captain in the Ten Years' War, Cuba, 1874

Over the summer of 1868, his father took him to graveyards to find human remains for anatomical study. Early sketches of bones moved him to pursue medical studies. Ramón y Cajal attended the medical school of the University of Zaragoza, where his father worked as an anatomy teacher. He graduated in 1873, aged 21, and then served as a medical officer in the Spanish Army. He took part in an expedition to Cuba in 1874–1875, where he contracted malaria and tuberculosis. To aid his recovery, Ramón y Cajal spent time in the spa-town Panticosa in the Pyrenees mountain range.

After returning to Spain, he received his doctorate in medicine in Madrid in 1877. Two years later, he became director of the Anatomical Museum at the University of Zaragoza and married Silveria Fañanás García, with whom he would have seven daughters and five sons. Ramón y Cajal worked at the University of Zaragoza until 1883, when he was awarded the position of anatomy professor of the University of Valencia. His early work at these two universities focused on the pathology of inflammation, the microbiology of cholera, and the structure of epithelial cells and tissues.

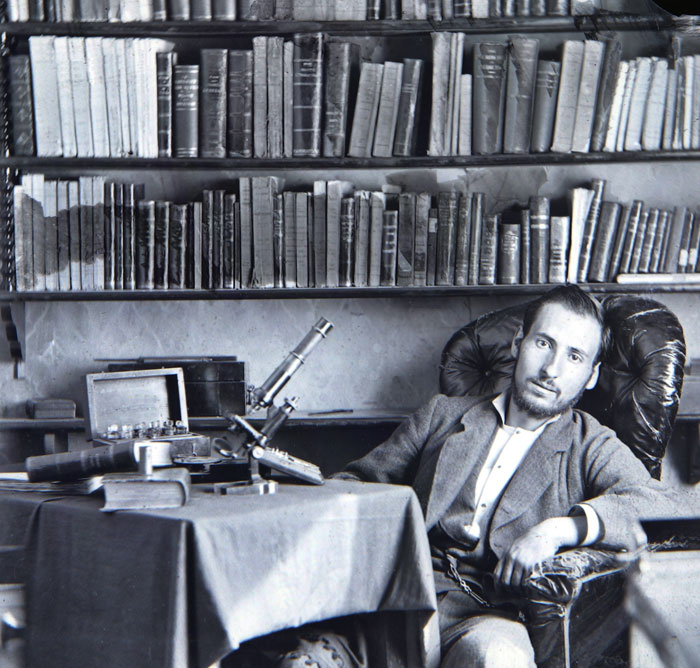
Self-portrait as a student, 1870s

In 1887 Ramón y Cajal moved to Barcelona for a professorship. There he first learned about Golgi's method, a cell staining method which uses potassium dichromate and silver nitrate to stain a subset of neurons a dark black color, while leaving the surrounding cells transparent. This method, which he improved, was central to his work, allowing him to turn his attention to the central nervous system (brain and spinal cord), in which neurons are so densely intertwined that standard microscopic inspection would be nearly impossible. During this period he made extensive detailed drawings of neural material, covering many species and most major regions of the brain.

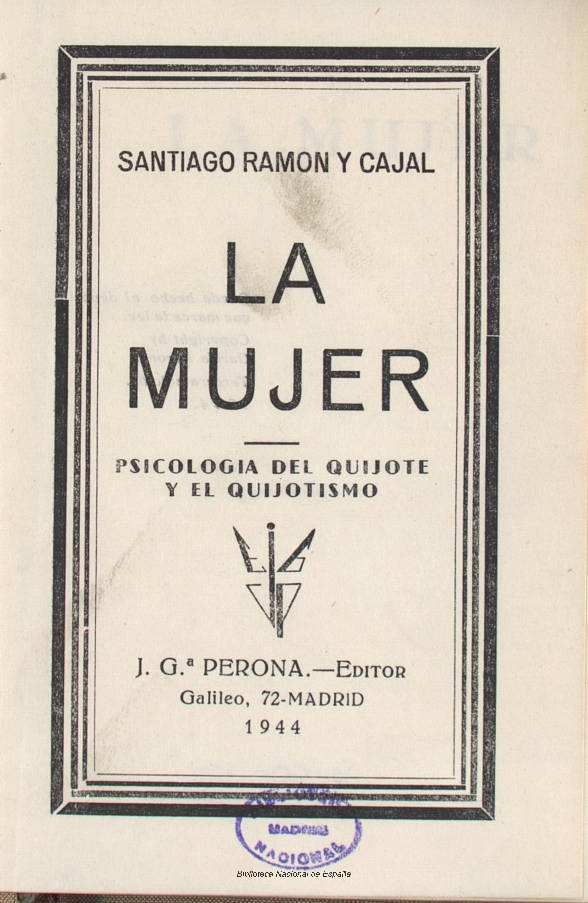
J. Harley Williams called Cajal the “Don Quixote of the microscope”.

In 1892, he became professor at Madrid. In 1899 he became director of the Instituto Nacional de Higiene – translated as National Institute of Hygiene, and in 1922 founder of the Laboratorio de Investigaciones Biológicas – translated as Laboratory of Biological Investigations, later renamed to Instituto Cajal, or Cajal Institute.

He died in Madrid on October 17, 1934, at the age of 82, continuing to work even on his deathbed.

== Political and religious views ==
In 1877, the 25-year-old Ramón y Cajal joined a Masonic lodge. John Brande Trend wrote in 1965 that Ramón y Cajal "was a liberal in politics, an evolutionist in philosophy, an agnostic in religion".

Nonetheless, Ramón y Cajal used the term soul "without any shame". In his final work, El mundo visto a los ochenta años (1934), Ramón y Cajal reflected on aging, mortality, and religion while continuing to be described by biographers as an agnostic.

In a lecture given on December 5, 1897 at the Spanish Royal Academy of Sciences, he said the following:

Esta nobleza, de la que se envanece con tanto mayor motivo cuanto que es su propia obra, consiste en ser ministro del progreso, sacerdote de la verdad y confidente del Creador. Él acierta exclusivamente a comprender algo de ese lenguaje misterioso que Dios ha escrito en los fenómenos de la Naturaleza; y a él solamente le ha sido dado desentrañar la maravillosa obra de la Creación para rendir a la Divinidad uno de los cultos más gratos y aceptos a un Supremo entendimiento, el de estudiar sus portentosas obras, para en ellas y por ellas conocerle, admirarle y reverenciarle. {{This nobility, of which he is embellished with all the greater reason as his own work, consists of being minister of progress, priest of truth and confidant of the Creator. He succeeds exclusively in understanding something of that mysterious language that God has written in the phenomena of Nature; and he has only been given to unravel the wonderful work of Creation to give the Divinity one of the most pleasing and accepted cult understandings to a Supreme, that of studying his portentous works, to in them and for them know him, admire him and revere him.}}

=== Political ideology ===
In addition to being a regenerationist, Ramón y Cajal is considered a Spanish nationalist and centralist, and in this sense he interprets non-Spanish nationalisms, such as Catalan and Basque, describing them as separatist. Despite accepting the Statute of Núria, and, in the academic sphere, that classes could also be given in Catalan language at the university, he did not feel comfortable. Although he died in 1934, in 1937, in the midst of Spanish civil war, the Gaceta de Melilla uses an old speech of his about the need for an "iron surgeon"

implicitly positioning him with the national-Catholic rebels against the Spanish Republic:

“Whatever the defeatists and pusillanimous augurs may say, the impetus of our race is not easily extinguished... It is necessary to impose the moral unity of the Peninsula, to merge the dissonances and spiritual stridor into a grandiose symphony. But for this we need the iron surgeon that Costa spoke of”

== Discoveries and theories ==
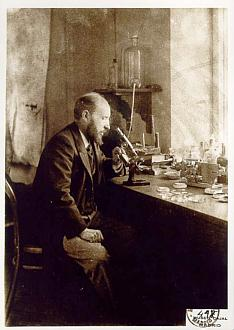
Ramón y Cajal in his laboratory

Ramón y Cajal made several major contributions to neuroanatomy. Excited by the discoveries of Frederick C. Kenyon, he explored the insect visual nervous system with his colleague Domingo Sánchez y Sánchez. He was stunned by the variety of neuron types. He discovered the axonal growth cone, and demonstrated experimentally that the relationship between nerve cells was not continuous, or a single system as per then extant reticular theory, but rather contiguous; there were gaps between neurons. This provided definitive evidence for what Heinrich Waldeyer would name "neuron theory", now widely considered the foundation of modern neuroscience. He is also considered by some to be the first "neuroscientist" since in 1894 he stated to the Royal Society of London: "The ability of neurons to grow in an adult and their power to create new connections can explain learning." This statement is considered to be the origin of the synaptic theory of memory.

He was an advocate of the existence of dendritic spines, although he did not recognize them as the site of contact from presynaptic cells. He was a proponent of polarization of nerve cell function and his student, Rafael Lorente de Nó, would continue this study of input-output systems into cable theory and some of the earliest circuit analysis of neural structures.

By producing depictions of neural structures and their connectivity and providing detailed descriptions of cell types he discovered a new type of cell, which was subsequently named after him, the interstitial cell of Cajal (ICC). This cell is found interleaved among neurons embedded within the smooth muscles lining the gut, serving as the generator and pacemaker of the slow waves of contraction which move material along the gastrointestinal tract, mediating neurotransmission from motor neurons to smooth muscle cells.

In his 1894 Croonian Lecture, Ramón y Cajal suggested (in an extended metaphor) that cortical pyramidal cells may become more elaborate with time, as a tree grows and extends its branches.

He studied some psychological phenomena, such as hypnotic suggestion to alleviate pain, which he used to help his wife during labor. A book he had written on these topics was lost during the Spanish Civil War.

During his studies on the optic chiasma, Cajal developed a visual map-based theory offering an evolutionary explanation for the decussation of nerve fibres and the chiasm of the optic tract.

== Distinctions ==
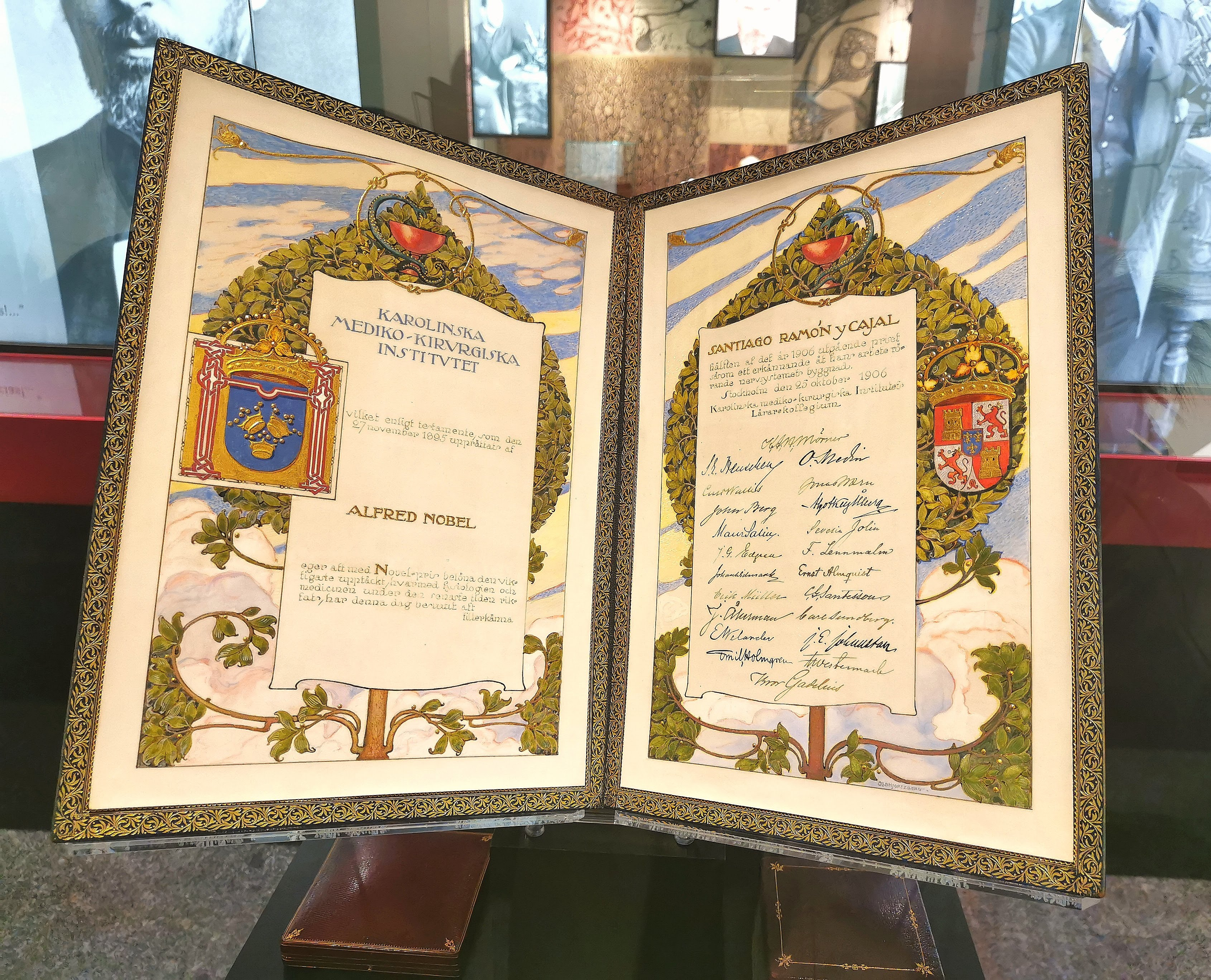
Ramón y Cajal's 1906 Nobel certificate; Museo Nacional de Ciencias Naturales, Madrid

Ramón y Cajal received many prizes, distinctions, and societal memberships during his scientific career, including honorary doctorates in medicine from Cambridge University and Würzburg University and an honorary doctorate in philosophy from Clark University. In 1905, Cajal was named an honorary member of the American Association for Anatomy. Cajal crater on the Moon was named after him in 1973.

The most famous distinction he was awarded was the Nobel Prize in Physiology or Medicine in 1906, together with the Italian scientist Camillo Golgi "in recognition of their work on the structure of the nervous system". This caused some controversy because Golgi, a staunch supporter of reticular theory, disagreed with Ramón y Cajal in his view of the neuron doctrine. Before Ramón y Cajal's work, Norwegian scientist Fridtjof Nansen had established the contiguous nature of nerve cells in his study of certain marine life, which Ramón y Cajal failed to cite. Ramón y Cajal was an International Member of both the United States National Academy of Sciences and the American Philosophical Society.

== In society and culture ==
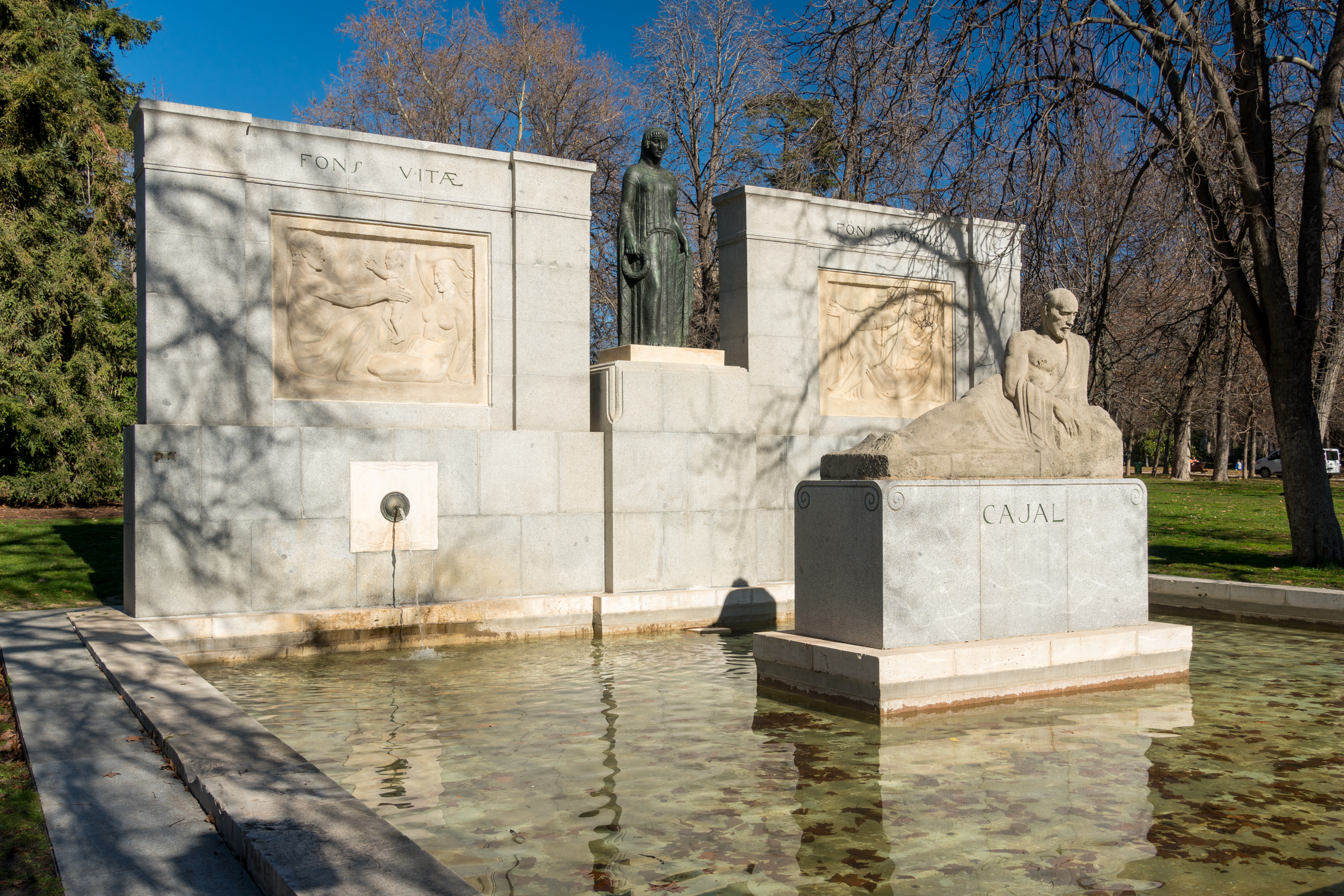
Monument at Retiro Park

In 1906 Joaquin Sorolla y Bastida painted Cajal's official portrait celebrating his Nobel Prize win.

Cajal posed for a statue that was created by the sculptor Mariano Benlliure and was installed in 1924 in the Paraninfo building at the School of Medicine of the University of Zaragoza.

In 1931 a monument was unveiled in Madrid, Spain. This full-body statue stands 3 meters (around 10 ft) high on a narrow pedestal and was created by Lorenzo Domínguez, a Chilean medical student.

In 1935, El Banco De España issued a 50 peseta banknote featuring a portrait of Cajal on the front and the Cajal Monument in Retiro Park on the back.

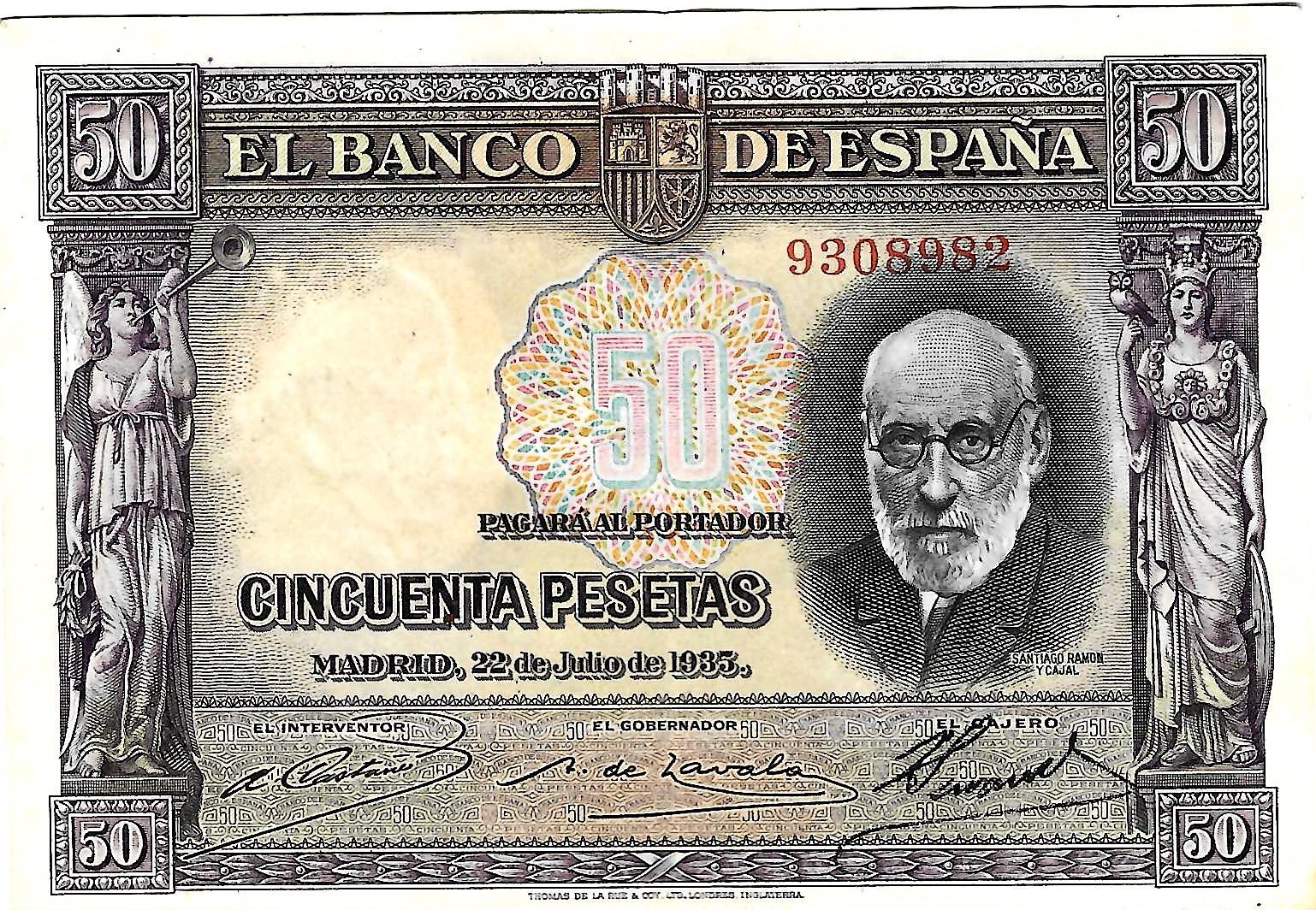
50 peseta banknote from 1935 – front side

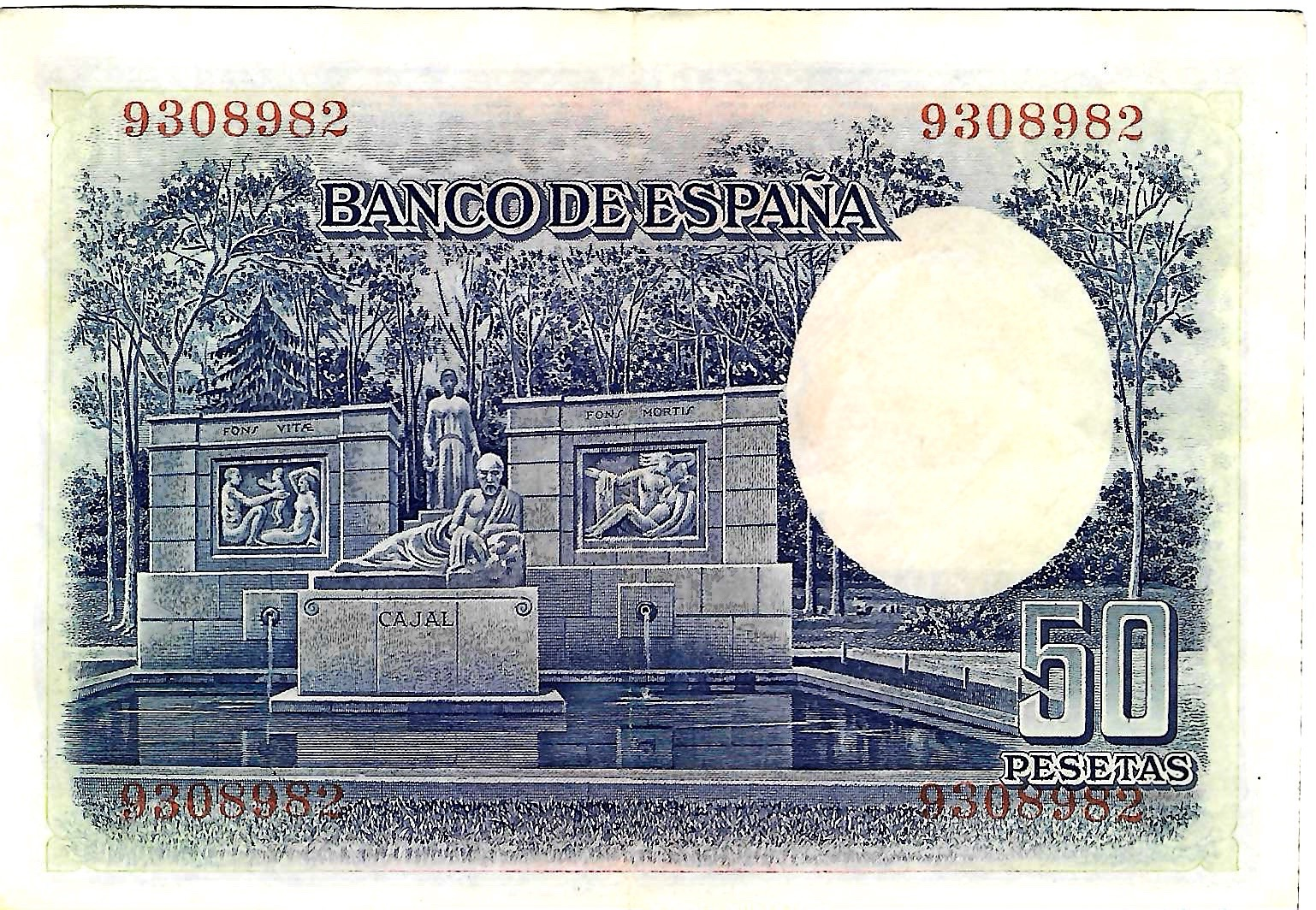
50 peseta banknote from 1935 – reverse side

1982 a TV mini series was created in Spain titled Ramón y Cajal: Historia de una voluntad.

In 2003, the first major exhibition of Cajal's scientific drawings opened in Madrid, Spain. The exhibition featured hundreds of restored original drawings, micrographic slides, and personal photographs created by Cajal. The accompanying catalog titled Santiago Ramon y Cajal (1852–2003) Ciencia y Arte features numerous high quality reproductions of Cajal's drawings and photo essays on the restoration process. Exhibition curators and contributing authors to the catalog include: Santiago Ramón y Cajal Junquera, Miguel Ángel Freire Mallo, Paloma Esteban Leal, Pablo García, Virginia G. Marin, Ma Cruz Osuna, Isabel Argerich Fernández, Paloma Calle, Marta C. Lopera, Ricardo Martínez, Pilar Sedano Espín, Eugenia Gimeno Pascual, Sonia Tortajada, and Juan Antonio Sáez Dégano.

In 2005 the asteroid 117413 Ramonycajal was named after him by Juan Lacruz.

In 2007, sculptures of Severo Ochoa and Santiago Ramón y Cajal created by Víctor Ochoa were unveiled at the Spanish National Research Council central headquarters in Madrid, Spain.

Santiago Ramón y Cajal Museum, Ayerbe, Huesca, Spain opened in 2013 and is located in Cajal's childhood home, where he lived with his family for ten years.

In 2014, the National Institutes of Health initiated an ongoing exhibition of original Ramón y Cajal drawings in the John Porter Neuroscience Research Center, located in the NIH central campus in Bethesda, MD, USA. The exhibition concept was spearheaded by NINDS Senior Researcher Jeffery Diamond and NINDS science writer Christopher Thomas and was made possible through close collaboration with the Instituto Cajal, Madrid, Spain. The exhibition also includes contemporary artwork curated by Jeff Diamond, which was created by artists Rebecca Kamen and Dawn Hunter. Inspired by Cajal's original drawings, Kamen's and Hunter's artworks are thematically representative of Cajal's aesthetic and are on permanent display for the public at the John Porter Neuroscience Research Center. Through the award of a 2017–2018 Fulbright España Senior Research Fellowship to the Instituto Cajal, Madrid, Spain, Hunter continued to develop her creative project about Cajal by referencing original source material.

A selection of Cajal's scientific drawings, personal photos, oil paintings, and pastel drawings were curated into the 14th Istanbul Biennial, Saltwater, that was held in Istanbul, Turkey from September 5 – November 1, 2015.

The exhibition Fisiología de los Sueños. Cajal, Tanguy, Lorca, Dalí... opened on October 5, 2015, and ended on January 16, 2016, at the University of Zaragoza, Zaragoza, Spain. Cajal's work was the centerpiece topic of the exhibition and the show explored the influence of histological drawings on Surrealism.

From January 31 – May 29, 2016, Cajal's work was featured in the inaugural exhibition for the re-opening of University of California's Berkeley Art Museum and Pacific Film Archive Architecture of Life. The catalog for the exhibition featured Cajal's drawing of the Purkinje Cell on the front cover.

The National Institutes of Health, USA, and the Instituto Cajal, Spain, held collaborative symposiums honoring Cajal on October 28, 2015, and May 24, 2017. The first symposium held at the NIH in 2015 was titled Bridging the Legacy of Santiago Ramón y Cajal, a symposium honoring the father of modern neuroscience. Keynote speaker Dr. Rafael Yuste was honored at a reception held at the Spanish Ambassador's, Ramón Gil-Casares, home. The second symposium titled, New Opportunities for NIH-CSIC Collaboration, was held at the Instituto Cajal in 2017. Dawn Hunter's Cajal Inventory art project was exhibited at the symposium for the general public in the institute's library. The Cajal Inventory consists of forty-five 11" x 14" drawings in which Hunter recreated in fine detail Cajal's scientific drawings from primary source, and surreal portrait drawings of Cajal inspired by his photography.

Every year since 2001, more than two hundred postdoctoral scholarships are awarded by the Spanish Ministry of Science to middle career scholars from different fields of knowledge. They are called "Ayudas a contratos Ramón y Cajal" to honor his memory.

An exhibition called The Beautiful Brain: The Drawings of Santiago Ramón y Cajal travelled through North America, beginning 2017 in the US at the Weisman Art Museum in Minneapolis, Minnesota. The exhibition traveled to the Morris and Helen Belkin Art Gallery, University of British Columbia, Vancouver, British Columbia, Canada, Grey Art Gallery, New York University, New York City, New York, USA, MIT Museum, Massachusetts Institute of Technology Cambridge, Massachusetts, USA, and ended in April 2019 at the Ackland Art Museum in Chapel Hill, North Carolina, USA. The Beautiful Brain book, published by Abrams, New York, accompanied the exhibition.

During 2019, the University of Zaragoza, Zaragoza, Spain opened an exhibition about Cajal titled Santiago Ramón y Cajal. 150 years at the University of Zaragoza. The exhibition had an accompanying catalog that featured the same title. The exhibition opened October 2019 and closed at the end of December 2019.

A short documentary by REDES is available on YouTube.

From November 19, 2020, to December 5, 2021, the National Museum of Natural Sciences, Madrid, Spain, hosted an exhibition featuring Cajal's scientific drawings, photographs, scientific equipment and personal objects from the Legado Cajal, Instituto Cajal, Madrid, Spain.

In 2020, over 75 volunteers collaborated as part of The Cajal Embroidery Project across 6 countries to create 81 intricate, exquisite hand-stitched panels of Ramón y Cajal's images, which were then curated and displayed by Edinburgh Neuroscience at the virtual FENS 2020 Forum, and showcased by The Lancet Neurology in their front covers in 2021.

In 2017, UNESCO (the United Nations Educational, Scientific and Cultural Organization) recognised Cajal's Legacy (which had been kept in a museum from 1945 to 1989) as a World Heritage treasure. Recognising that this cultural treasure deserves a dedicated museum, showcasing not only Cajal's but also his disciples' legacies, there has been a call for a dedicated museum to commemorate and celebrate Ramón y Cajal's discoveries and impact on neuroscience.

Project Encephalon organised Cajal Week to celebrate his 169th birth anniversary from 1 May to 7 May 2021.

The Brain In Search Of Itself, an English language biography, was published in 2022.

== Publications ==
He published more than 100 scientific works and articles in Spanish, French and German. Among his works were:

- Rules and advice on scientific investigation
- Histology
- Degeneration and regeneration of the nervous system
- Manual of normal histology and micrographic technique
- Elements of histology

A list of his books includes:

- Ramón y Cajal, Santiago (1905) [1890]. Manual de Anatomia Patológica General (Handbook of general Anatomical Pathology) (in Spanish) (fourth ed.).
- Ramón y Cajal, Santiago; Richard Greeff (1894). Die Retina der Wirbelthiere: Untersuchungen mit der Golgi-cajal'schen Chromsilbermethode und der ehrlich'schen Methylenblaufärbung (Retina of vertebrates) (in German). Bergmann.
- Ramón y Cajal, Santiago; L. Azoulay (1894). Les nouvelles idées sur la structure du système nerveux chez l'homme et chez les vertébrés (New ideas on the fine anatomy of the nerve centres) (in French). C. Reinwald.
- Ramón y Cajal, Santiago; Johannes Bresler; E. Mendel (1896). Beitrag zum Studium der Medulla Oblongata: Des Kleinhirns und des Ursprungs der Gehirnnerven (in German). Verlag von Johann Ambrosius Barth.
- Ramón y Cajal, Santiago (1898). "Estructura del quiasma óptico y teoría general de los entrecruzamientos de las vías nerviosas. (Structure of the Chiasma opticum and general theory of the crossing of nerve tracks)" [Die Structur des Chiasma opticum nebst einer allgemeine Theorie der Kreuzung der Nervenbahnen (German, 1899, Verlag Joh. A. Barth)]. Rev. Trim. Micrográfica (in Spanish). 3: 15–65.
- Ramón y Cajal, Santiago (1899). Comparative study of the sensory areas of the human cortex. Clark University. p. 85.
- Ramón y Cajal, Santiago (1899–1904). Textura del sistema nervioso del hombre y los vertebrados (in Spanish). Madrid. ISBN 978-84-340-1723-8.
  - —— (1909). Histologie du système nerveux de l'homme & des vertébrés (in French) – via Internet Archive.
  - —— (2002-10-14). Texture of the Nervous System of Man and the Vertebrates. Springer. ISBN 978-3-211-83202-8.
- Ramón y Cajal, Santiago (1906). Studien über die Hirnrinde des Menschen v.5 (Studies about the meninges of man) (in German). Johann Ambrosius Barth.
- Ramón y Cajal, Santiago (1999) [1897]. Advice for a Young Investigator. Translated by Neely Swanson and Larry W. Swanson. Cambridge: MIT Press. ISBN 0-262-68150-1.
- Ramón y Cajal, Santiago; Domingo Sánchez y Sánchez (1915). Contribución al conocimiento de los centros nerviosos de los insectos (in Spanish). Madrid: Imprenta de Hijos de Nicolas Moya.
- Ramón y Cajal, Santiago (1937). Recuerdos de mi Vida (in Spanish). Cambridge: MIT Press. ISBN 84-206-2290-7.

In 1905, he published five science-fiction stories called "Vacation Stories" under the pen name "Dr. Bacteria".

== Gallery of drawings ==
First illustration by Cajal (1888) of the nervous system. (A) First page of the article. (B) Vertical section of a cerebellar convolution of a hen. (C) Cerebellum of an adult bird. (D) Higher magnification of (C) showing Purkinje cell. (E) Dendrite of the Purkinje cell.

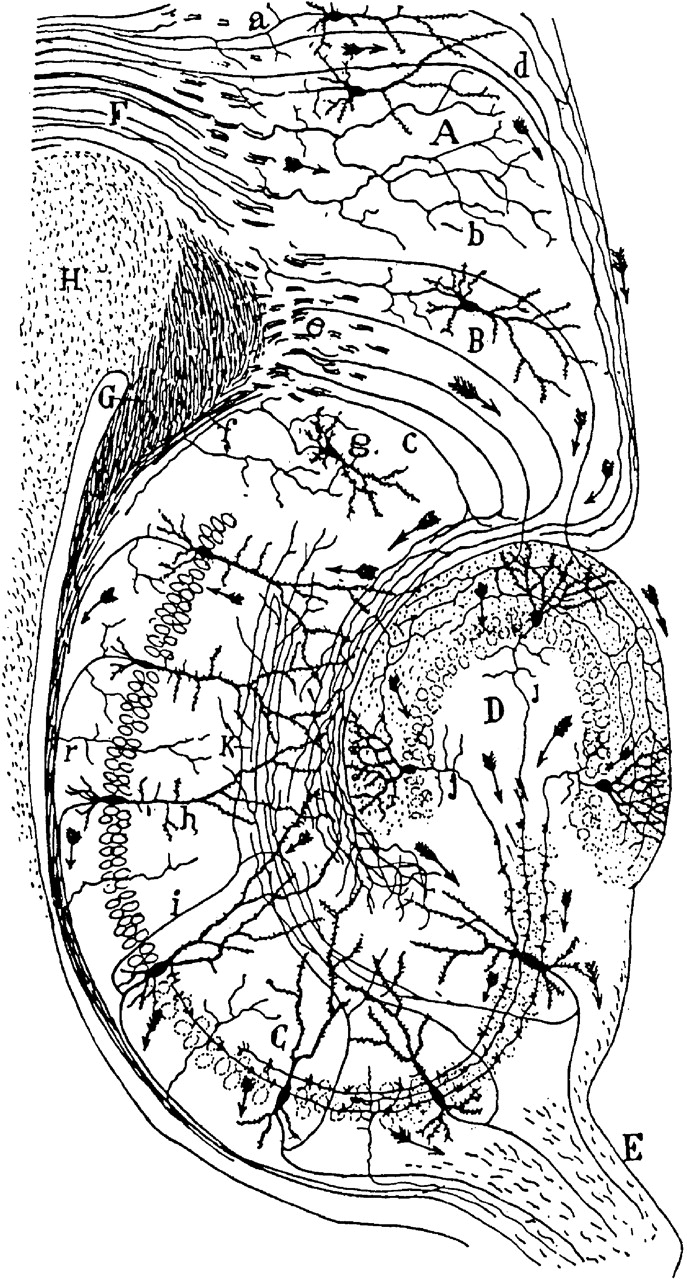
Drawing of the neural circuitry of the rodent hippocampus. Histologie du Système Nerveux de l'Homme et des Vertébrés, Vols. 1 and 2. A. Maloine. Paris. 1911

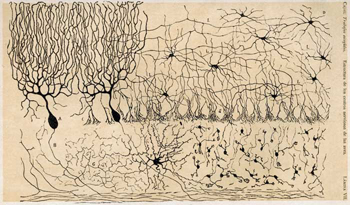
Drawing of the cells of the chick cerebellum, from "Estructura de los centros nerviosos de las aves", Madrid, 1905

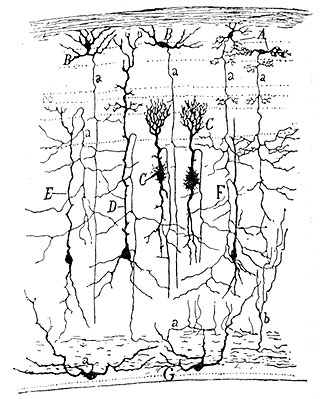
Drawing of a section through the optic tectum of a sparrow, from "Estructura de los centros nerviosos de las aves", Madrid, 1905

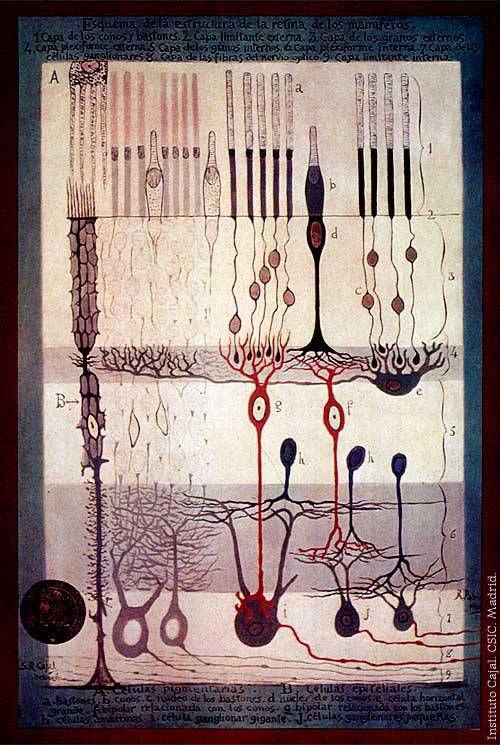
From "Structure of the Mammalian Retina" Madrid, 1900

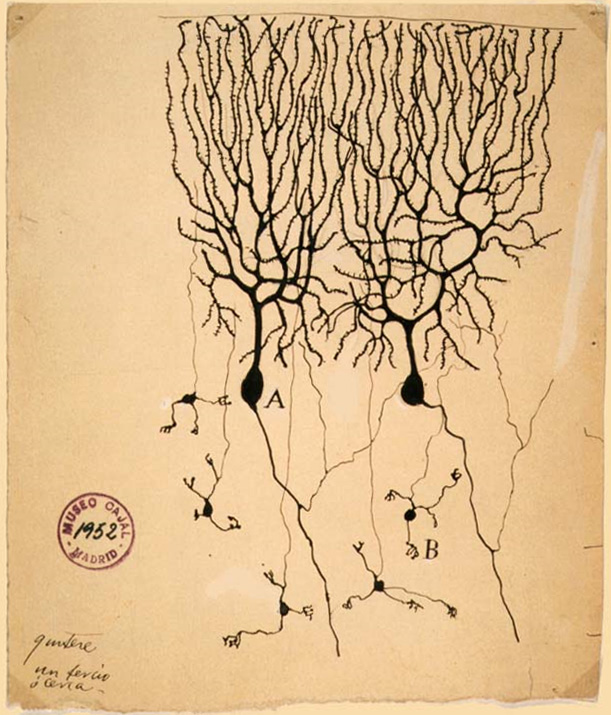
Drawing of Purkinje cells (A) and granule cells (B) from pigeon cerebellum by Santiago Ramón y Cajal, 1899. Instituto Santiago Ramón y Cajal, Madrid, Spain

Drawing of Cajal-Retzius cells, 1891

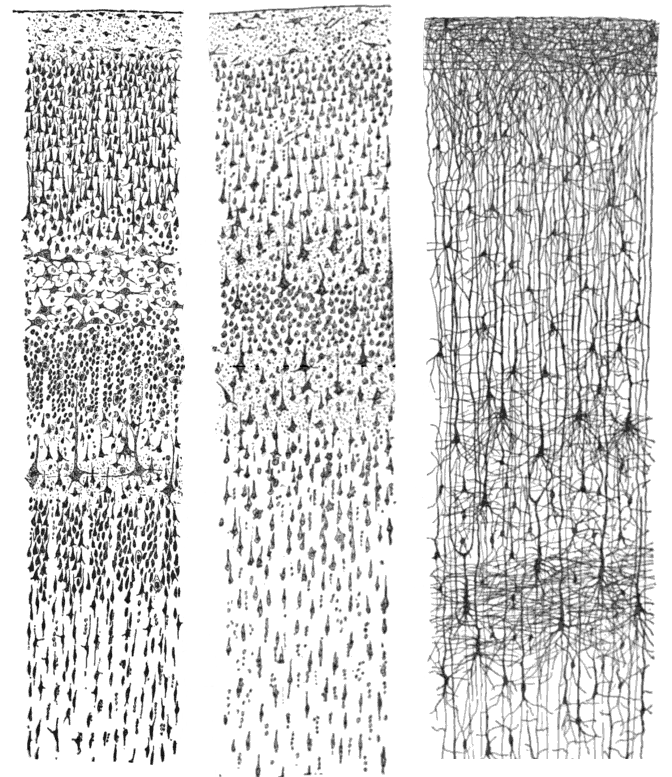
Drawn in 1899, taken from the book "Comparative study of the sensory areas of the human cortex"

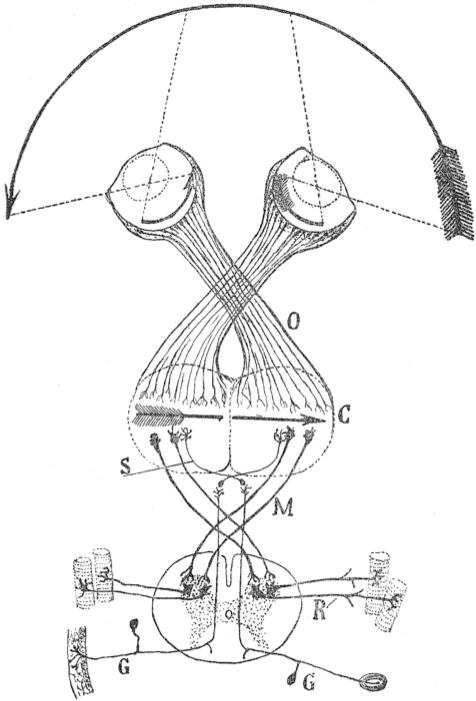
schema of the visual map theory (1898). O=Optic chiasm; C=Visual (and motor) cortex; M, S=Decussating pathways; R, G: Sensory nerves, motor ganglia.

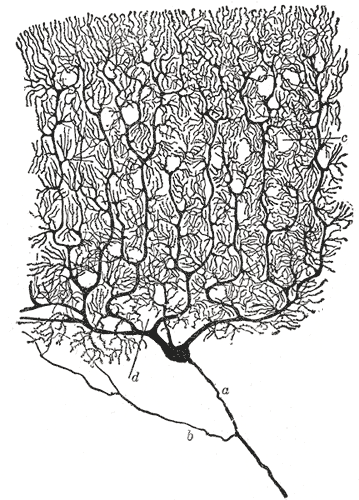
Purkinje cell of the human cerebellum. Golgi method. -a, axon; b, recurrent collateral; c and d, spaces in the dendritic arborization for stellate cells, by Santiago Ramón y Cajal. (See Fig. 9 in Ref.)

== See also ==
- List of pathologists

== Bibliography ==
- Everdell, William R. (1998). The First Moderns. Chicago: University of Chicago Press.
- Mazzarello, Paolo (2010). Golgi: A Biography of the Founder of Modern Neuroscience. Translated by Aldo Badiani and Henry A. Buchtel. New York: Oxford University Press.
