= Petilla de Aragón =

- Municipality
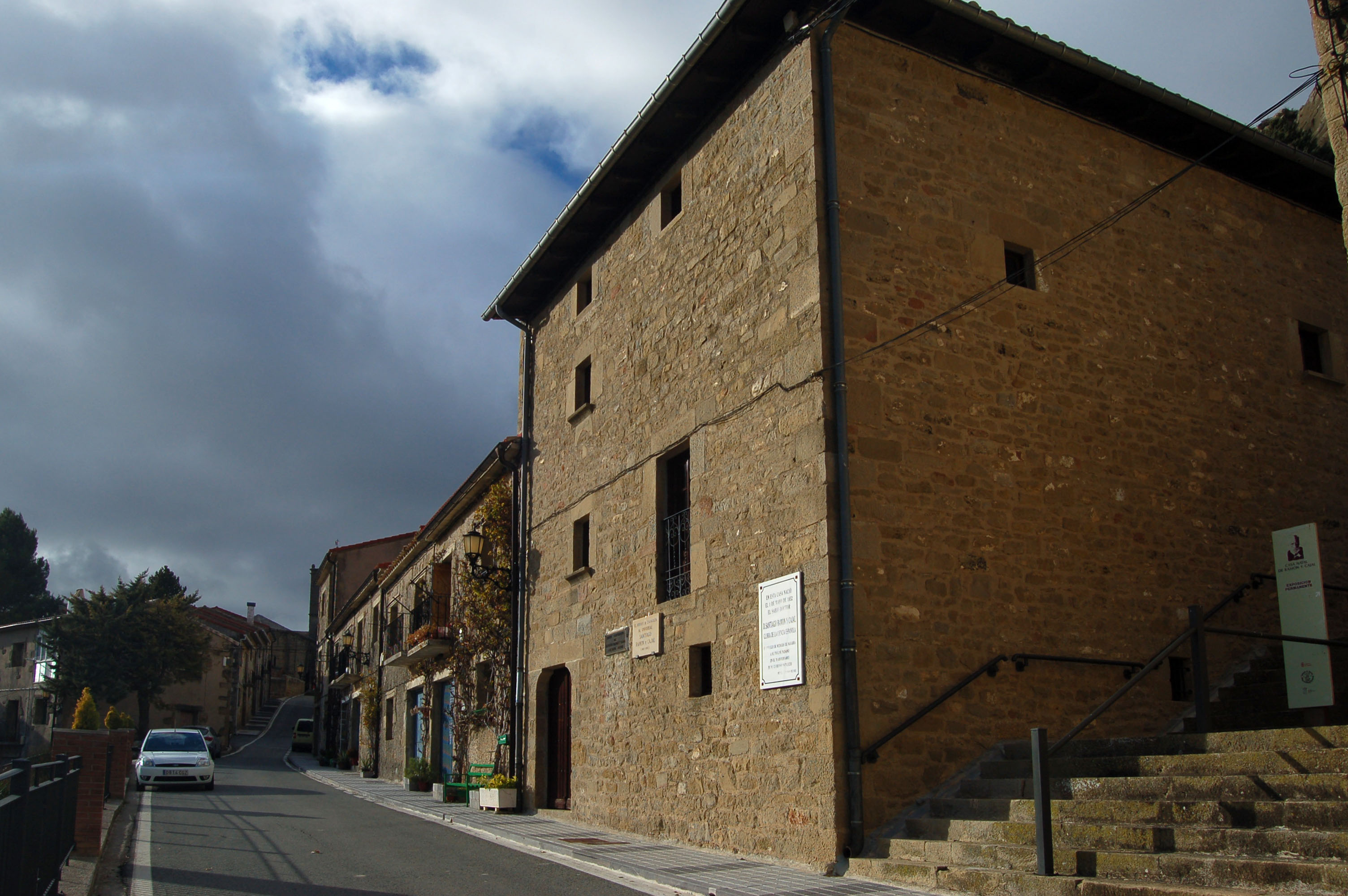
- Ramón y Cajal's birthplace in Petilla de Aragón

- Flag Coat of arms

- Location in Spain Petilla de Aragón (Aragon) Petilla de Aragón (Spain)
- Coordinates: 42°27′41″N 1°5′34″W
- Country: Spain
- Autonomous community: Navarre
- Province: Navarre
- Comarca: Comarca de Sangüesa
- Judicial district: Aoiz

Government
  - Mayor: Florentino Aguas Arilla (2015-)

Area
  - Total: 27.55 km^{2} (10.64 sq mi)
- Elevation: 843 m (2,766 ft)

Population (2025-01-01)
  - Total: 29
  - Density: 1.1/km^{2} (2.7/sq mi)
- Demonym: Petillés
- Time zone: UTC+1 (CET)
  - Summer (DST): UTC+2 (CEST)
- Postal code: 50686

Petilla de Aragón (Basque: Aragoiko Txapela) is a town and municipality of the autonomous community of Navarra, northern Spain. The municipality itself is formed by two enclaves, Petilla de Aragón itself and Los Bastanes (also known as Baztán de Petilla), that are entirely surrounded by the neighboring autonomous community of Aragón.

In the 15th century, Petilla was the site of a battle between the Navarrese and Aragonese armies in which the fictional troubadour Manrico and the Conte di Luna, of Verdi's Il trovatore.

== Notable people ==
- Santiago Ramón y Cajal (1852–1934) was born here; Petilla terminology, a neurological nomenclature, is named after the town. Nobel Laureate.
