= Neuron doctrine =

Concept that the nervous system is made up of discrete individual cells

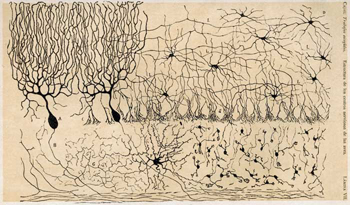
Ramón y Cajal's drawing of the cells of the chick cerebellum, from Estructura de los centros nerviosos de las aves, Madrid, 1905

The neuron doctrine is the concept that the nervous system is made up of discrete individual cells, a discovery due to decisive neuro-anatomical work of Santiago Ramón y Cajal and later presented by, among others, H. Waldeyer-Hartz. The term neuron (spelled neurone in British English) was itself coined by Waldeyer as a way of identifying the cells in question. The neuron doctrine, as it became known, served to position neurons as special cases under the broader cell theory evolved some decades earlier. He appropriated the concept not from his own research but from the disparate observation of the histological work of Albert von Kölliker, Camillo Golgi, Franz Nissl, Santiago Ramón y Cajal, Auguste Forel and others.

== Historical context ==
Theodor Schwann proposed in 1839 that the tissues of all organisms are composed of cells. Schwann was expanding on the proposal of his good friend Matthias Jakob Schleiden the previous year that all plant tissues were composed of cells. The nervous system stood as an exception. Although nerve cells had been described in tissue by numerous investigators including Jan Purkinje, Gabriel Valentin, and Robert Remak, the relationship between the nerve cells and other features such as dendrites and axons was not clear. The connections between the large cell bodies and smaller features could not be observed, and it was possible that neurofibrils would stand as an exception to cell theory as non-cellular components of living tissue. Technical limitations of microscopy and tissue preparation were largely responsible. Chromatic aberration, spherical aberration and the dependence on natural light all played a role in limiting microscope performance in the early 19th century. Tissue was typically lightly mashed in water and pressed between a glass slide and cover slip. There was also a limited number of dyes and fixatives available prior to the middle of the 19th century.

A landmark development came from Camillo Golgi who invented a silver staining technique in 1873 which he called la reazione nera (black reaction), but more popularly known as Golgi stain or Golgi method. Using this technique nerve cells with their highly branched dendrites and axon could be clearly visualised against a yellow background. Unfortunately Golgi described the nervous system as a continuous single network, in support of a notion called reticular theory. It was reasonable at the time because under light microscope the nerve cells are merely a mesh of single thread. Santiago Ramón y Cajal started investigating nervous system in 1887 using Golgi stain. In the first issue of the Revista Trimestral de Histología Normal y Patológica (May, 1888) Ramón y Cajal reported that the nerve cells were not continuous in the brain of birds. Ramón y Cajal's discovery was the decisive evidence for the discontinuity of nervous system and the presence of large number of individual nerve cells. Golgi refused to accept the neuron theory and hung on to the reticular theory. Golgi and Ramón y Cajal were jointly awarded the 1906 Nobel Prize for Physiology or Medicine, but the controversy between the two scientists continued. The matter was finally resolved in the 1950s with the development of electron microscopy by which it was unambiguously demonstrated that nerve cells were individual cells interconnected through synapses to form a nervous system, thereby validating the neuron theory.

== Elements ==
Neuron theory is an example of consilience where low level theories are absorbed into higher level theories that explain the base data as part of higher order structure. As a result, the neuron doctrine has multiple elements, each of which were the subject of low level theories, debate, and primary data collection. Some of these elements are imposed by the necessity of cell theory that Waldeyer was trying to use to explain the direct observations, and other elements try to explain observations so that they are compatible with cell theory.

Neural units
The brain is made up of individual units that contain specialized features such as dendrites, a cell body, and an axon.
Neurons are cells
These individual units are cells as understood from other tissues in the body.
Specialization
These units may differ in size, shape, and structure according to their location or functional specialization.
Nucleus is key
The nucleus is the trophic center for the cell. If the cell is divided only the portion containing the nucleus will survive.
Nerve fibers are cell processes
Nerve fibers are outgrowths of nerve cells.
Cell division
Nerve cells are generated by cell division.
Contact
Nerve cells are connected by sites of contact and not cytoplasmic continuity. Waldeyer himself was neutral on this point, and strictly speaking the neuron doctrine does not depend upon this element. The heart is an example of excitable tissue where the cells connect via cytoplasmic continuity and yet is perfectly consistent with cell theory. This is true of other examples such as connections between horizontal cells of the retina, or the Mauthner cell synapse in goldfish.
Law of dynamic polarization
Although the axon can conduct in both directions, in tissue there is a preferred direction for transmission from cell to cell. Later elements that were not included by Waldeyer, but were added in the following decades.
Synapse
A barrier to transmission exists at the site of contact between two neurons that may permit transmission.
Unity of transmission
If a contact is made between two cells, then that contact can be either excitatory or inhibitory, but will always be of the same type.
Dale's law
Each nerve terminal releases a single type of transmitter.

== Update ==
While the neuron doctrine is a central tenet of modern neuroscience, recent studies suggest that there are notable exceptions and important additions to our knowledge about how neurons function.

Electrical synapses are more common in the central nervous system than previously thought. Thus, rather than functioning as individual units, in some parts of the brain large ensembles of neurons may be active simultaneously to process neural information. Electrical synapses are formed by gap junctions that allow molecules to directly pass between neurons, creating a cytoplasm-to-cytoplasm connection, known as a syncytium.

Furthermore, the phenomenon of cotransmission, in which more than one neurotransmitter is released from a single presynaptic terminal (contrary to Dale's law), contributes to the complexity of information transmission within the nervous system.
