= Camillo Golgi =

Italian biologist and pathologist (1843–1926)

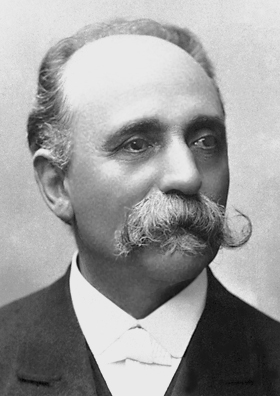
- Golgi in a 1903 publication
- Born: 7 July 1843; Corteno, Kingdom of Lombardy–Venetia, Austrian Empire
- Died: 21 January 1926 (aged 82); Pavia, Italy
- Education: University of Pavia
- Known for: Golgi's method Golgi apparatus Golgi tendon organ Golgi cell Golgi cycles Reticular theory Radial glial cell Perineuronal net
- Awards: Nobel Prize in Physiology or Medicine (1906); Pour le Mérite (1914)
- Scientific career
- Fields: Pathology; Neuroscience
- Doctoral advisor: Cesare Lombroso
- Doctoral students: Antonio Pensa

Camillo Golgi (/ˈɡɒldʒi/, Italian: [kaˈmilːo ˈɡɔldʒi]; 7 July 1843 – 21 January 1926) was an Italian biologist and pathologist who was awarded the 1906 Nobel Prize in Physiology or Medicine for his works on the central nervous system. He studied medicine at the University of Pavia (where he later spent most of his professional career) between 1860 and 1868 under the tutelage of Cesare Lombroso. Inspired by pathologist Giulio Bizzozero, he pursued research in the nervous system. His discovery of a staining technique called black reaction (sometimes called Golgi's method or Golgi's staining in his honour) in 1873 was a major breakthrough in neuroscience. Several structures and phenomena in anatomy and physiology are named for him, including the Golgi apparatus, the Golgi tendon organ and the Golgi tendon reflex.

Golgi and the Spanish biologist Santiago Ramón y Cajal were jointly awarded the Nobel Prize in Physiology or Medicine in 1906 "in recognition of their work on the structure of the nervous system".

== Biography ==
Camillo Golgi was born on 7 July 1843 in the village of Corteno near Brescia, in the province of Brescia (Lombardy), at the time Kingdom of Lombardy–Venetia, today Italy. The village is now named Corteno Golgi in his honour. He was the son of Alessandro and Carolina Golgi, and his father was a physician and district medical officer, originally from Pavia. In 1860, he entered the University of Pavia to study medicine, and earned his medical degree in 1865. He did an internship at the San Matteo Hospital (now IRCCS Policlinico San Matteo Foundation). During his internship he briefly worked as a civil physician in the Italian Army, and as assistant surgeon at the Novara Hospital (now Azienda Ospedaliero Universitaria Maggiore della Carità di Novara). At the same time he was also involved in the medical team for investigating cholera epidemic in villages around Pavia.

In 1867, he resumed his academic study under the supervision of Cesare Lombroso. Lombroso was a renowned scientist in medical psychology with an expertise in mental conditions such as genius, madness and criminality. Inspired by Lombroso, Golgi wrote a thesis on the etiology of mental disorders, from which he obtained his M.D. in 1868. He became more interested in experimental medicine, and started attending the Institute of General Pathology headed by Giulio Bizzozero. Three years his junior, Bizzozero was an eloquent teacher and experimenter, who specialised in histology of the nervous system and the properties of bone marrow. The most important research publications of Golgi were directly or indirectly influenced by Bizzozero. The two became so close that they lived in the same building; and Golgi later married Bizzozero's niece, Lina Aletti. By 1872, Golgi was an established clinician and histopathologist. He, however, had no opportunity as a tenured professor in Pavia to pursue teaching and research in neurology.

Financial pressure prompted him to join the Hospital of the Chronically Ill (Pio Luogo degli Incurabili) in Abbiategrasso, near Milan, as Chief Medical Officer in 1872. To continue research, he set up a simple laboratory on his own in a refurbished hospital kitchen, and it was there that he started making his most notable discoveries. His major achievement was the development of staining technique for nerve tissue called the black reaction (later the Golgi's method). He published his major works between 1875 and 1885 in the journal Rivista sperimentale di Freniatria e di medicina legale. In 1875, he joined the faculty of histology at the University of Pavia. In 1879, he was appointed Chair of Anatomy at the University of Siena. But the next year, he returned to the University of Pavia as full Professor of histology. From 1879 he also became Professor of General Pathology as well as Honorary Chief (Primario ad honorarem) at the San Matteo Hospital. He served as Rector of the University of Pavia twice, first between 1893 and 1896, and second between 1901 and 1909. During the First World War (1914–1917), he directed the military hospital Collegio Borrmeo at Pavia. He retired in 1918 and continued to research in his private laboratory until 1923. He died on 21 January 1926.

=== Personal life ===
Golgi and his wife Lina Aletti had no children, and they adopted Golgi's niece Carolina.

Golgi was irreligious in his later life and became an agnostic atheist. One of his former students attempted an unsuccessful deathbed conversion on him.

== Contributions ==
=== Black reaction or Golgi's staining ===
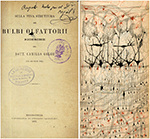
The first illustration by Golgi of the nervous system. Vertical section of the olfactory bulb of a dog (in 1875).

The central nervous system was difficult to study during Golgi's time because the cells were hard to identify. The available tissue staining techniques were useless for studying nervous tissue. While working as chief medical officer at the Hospital of the Chronically Ill, he experimented with metal impregnation of nervous tissue, using mainly silver (silver staining). In early 1873, he discovered a method of staining nervous tissue that would stain a limited number of cells at random in their entirety. He first treated the tissue with potassium dichromate to harden it, and then with silver nitrate. Under the microscope, the outline of the neuron became distinct from the surrounding tissue and cells. The silver chromate precipitate, as a reaction product, selectively stains only some cellular components randomly, sparing other cell parts. The silver chromate particles create a stark black deposit on the soma (nerve cell body) as well as on the axon and all dendrites, providing an exceedingly clear and well-contrasted picture of neuron against a yellow background. This makes it easier to trace the structure of the nerve cells in the brain for the first time. Since cells are selective stained in black, he called the process la reazione nera ("the black reaction"), but today it is called Golgi's method or the Golgi stain. On 16 February 1873, he wrote to his friend Niccolò Manfredi:

I am delighted that I have found a new reaction to demonstrate, even to the blind, the structure of the interstitial stroma of the cerebral cortex.

His discovery was published in the Gazzeta Medica Italiani on 2 August 1873.

=== Nervous system ===
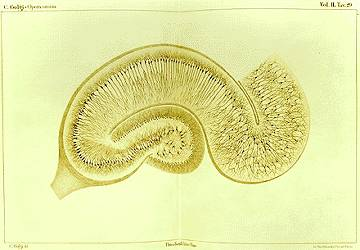
Drawing by Camillo Golgi of a hippocampus stained with the silver nitrate method

In 1871, a German anatomist Joseph von Gerlach postulated that the brain is a complex "protoplasmic network", in the form of a continuous network called the reticulum. Using his black reaction, Golgi could trace various regions of the cerebro-spinal axis, clearly distinguishing the different nervous projections, namely axon from the dendrites. He drew up a new classification of cells on the basis of the structure of their nervous prolongation. He described an extremely dense and intricate network, composed of a web of intertwined branches of axons coming from different cell layers ("diffuse nervous network"). This network structure, which emerges from the axons, is essentially different from that hypothesized by Gerlach. It was the main organ of the central nervous system according to Golgi. Thus, Golgi presented the reticular theory which states that the brain is a single network of nerve fibres, and not of discrete cells. Although Golgi's earlier works between 1873 and 1885 clearly depicted the axonal connections of cerebellar cortex and olfactory bulb as independent of one another, his later works including the Nobel Lecture showed the entire granular layer of the cerebellar cortex occupied by a network of branching and anastomosing nerve processes. This was due to his strong conviction in the reticular theory. Golgi's theory was challenged by Ramón y Cajal, who used the same technique developed by Golgi. According to Ramón y Cajal's neurone theory, the nervous system is but a collection of individual cells, the neurones, which are interconnected to form a network.

In addition to this, Golgi was the first to give clear descriptions of the structure of the cerebellum, hippocampus, spinal cord, olfactory lobe, as well as striatal and cortical lesions in a case of chorea. In 1878, he also discovered a receptor organ that senses changes in muscle tension, and is now known as Golgi tendon organ or Golgi receptor; and Golgi-Mazzoni corpuscles (pressure transductors). He further developed a stain specific for myelin (a specialised membrane which wraps around the axon) using potassium dichromate and mercuric chloride. Using this he discovered the myelin annular apparatus, often called the horny funnel of Golgi-Rezzonico.

=== Kidney ===
Golgi studied kidney function during 1882 to 1889. In 1882, he published his observations on the mechanism of renal hypertrophy, which he understood to be due to renal cell proliferation. In 1884, he described tubular cell mitoses in the kidney of a person suffering from tubulointerstitial nephritis, and he noted that the process was an essential part of repairing the kidney tissue. He was the first to dissect out intact nephrons, and show that the distal tubulus (loop of Henle) of the nephron returns to its originating glomerulus, a finding that he published in 1889 ("Annotazioni intorno all'Istologia dei reni dell'uomo e di altri mammifieri e sull'istogenesi dei canalicoli oriniferi". Rendiconti R. Acad. Lincei 5: 545–557, 1889).

=== Malaria ===
A French Army physician Charles Louis Alphonse Laveran discovered that malaria was caused by microscopic parasite (now called Plasmodium falciparum) in 1880. But scientists were sceptical until Golgi intervened. It was Golgi who helped him prove that malarial parasite was a microscopic protozoan. From 1885, Golgi studied the malarial parasite and its transmission. He established two types of malaria, tertian and quartan fevers caused by Plasmodium vivax and Plasmodium malariae respectively. In 1886, he discovered that malarial fever (paroxysm) was produced by the asexual stage in the human blood (called erythrocytic cycle, or Golgi cycle). In 1889–1890, Golgi and Ettore Marchiafava described the differences between benign tertian malaria and malignant tertian malaria (the latter caused by P. falciparum). By 1898, along with Giovanni Battista Grassi, Amico Bignami, Giuseppe Bastianelli, Angelo Celli and Marchiafava, he confirmed that malaria was transmitted by anopheline mosquitoes.

=== Cell organelle ===
Golgi discovered an organelle in eukaryotic cells now known as Golgi apparatus or Golgi complex, or sometimes simply as Golgi. He modified his black reaction using osmium dichromate solution with which he stained the nerve cells (Purkinje cells) of the cerebellum of a Western barn owl. He noticed thread-like networks inside the cells and named them apparato reticolare interno (internal reticular apparatus). Recognising them to be unique cellular components, he presented his discovery before the Medical-Surgical Society of Pavia in April 1898. After the same was confirmed by his assistant Emilio Veratti, he published it in the Bollettino della Società medico-chirurgica di Pavia. However, most scientists disputed his discovery as nothing but a staining artefact. Their microscopes were not powerful enough to identify the organelles. By the 1930s, Golgi's description was largely rejected. It was only firmly established 50 years after its discovery, when electron microscopes were developed.

== Awards and legacy ==
In 1903, Golgi was named an honorary member of the American Association for Anatomy.

Golgi, together with Santiago Ramón y Cajal, received the Nobel Prize in Physiology or Medicine in 1906 for his studies of the structure of the nervous system. Prior to the work that earned Cajal and Golgi their prize, there was a debate over how nerve impulses were conducted in the brain. One camp thought that neurons fused (between axon terminals of cell #1 and dendrites of cell #2), so that the brain essentially became one contiguous cell, a superneuron; this would result in a syncytium, forming the basis of the obsolete reticular theory. The other camp thought that neurons didn't fuse, but met in very close proximity, and this was called the neuron doctrine. Resolution of the cellular components at the point of interaction between cells was impossible at the time, and would only become possible much later with the invention of the electron microscope in the 1950s. But with Golgi's stain, Cajal was able to decisively demonstrate the outline of a complete neuron, to the exclusion of adjacent neurons, thereby demonstrating that a universal neural syncytium did not exist. Cajal and Golgi, being from opposing camps, came to hate each other and would not speak. When they arrived in Stockholm to receive their joint prize, Cajal managed to put their differences aside enough to praise Golgi, but Golgi did not reciprocate.

In 1900 Golgi was named senator by King Umberto I. In 1913 he became foreign member of the Royal Netherlands Academy of Arts and Sciences. He received honorary doctorates from the University of Cambridge, University of Geneva, Kristiania University College, National and Kapodistrian University of Athens, and Paris-Sorbonne University. In 1994, the European Community commemorated him with postage stamps.

=== Monuments in Pavia ===
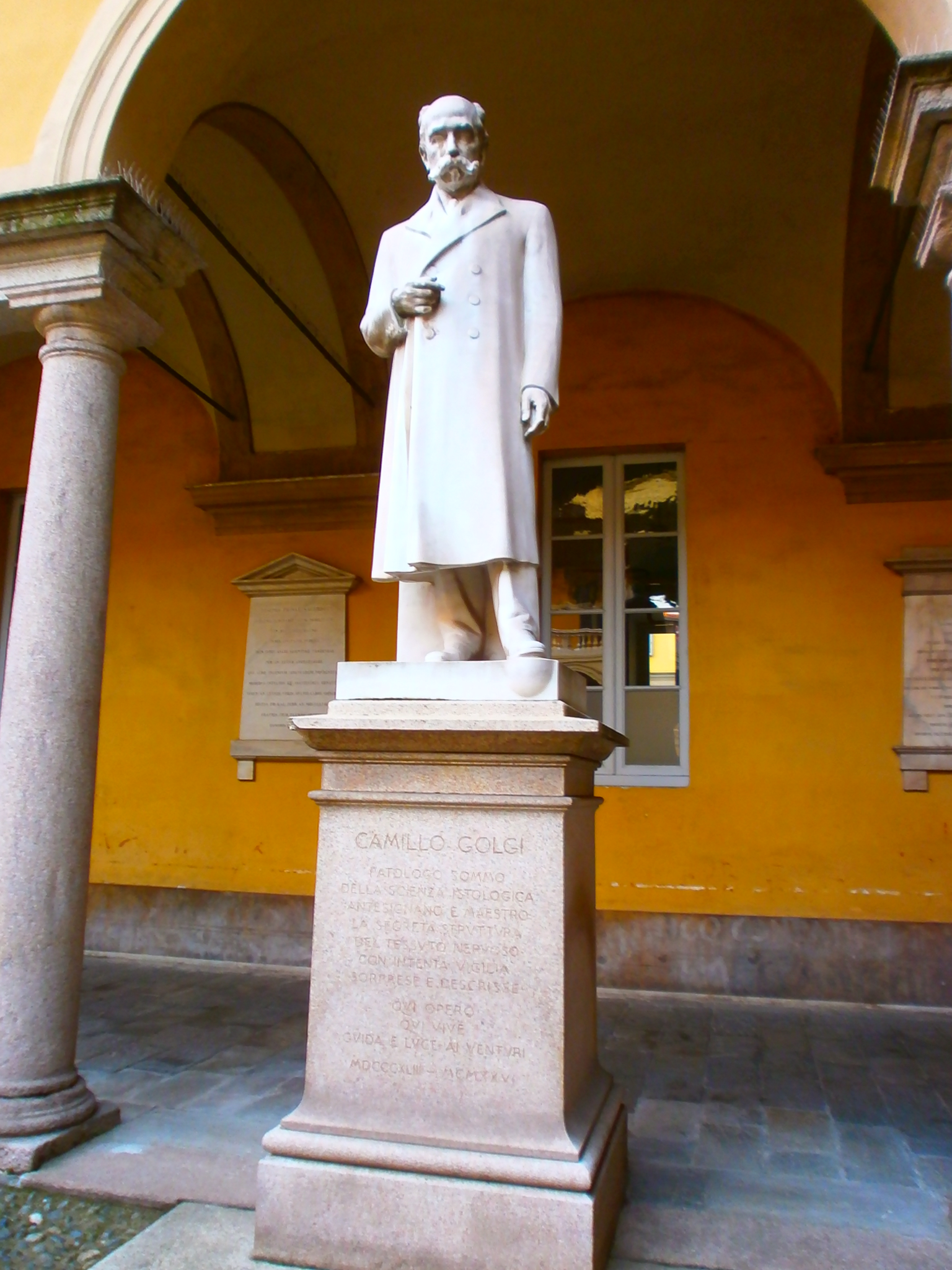
Marble statue of Golgi at the University of Pavia

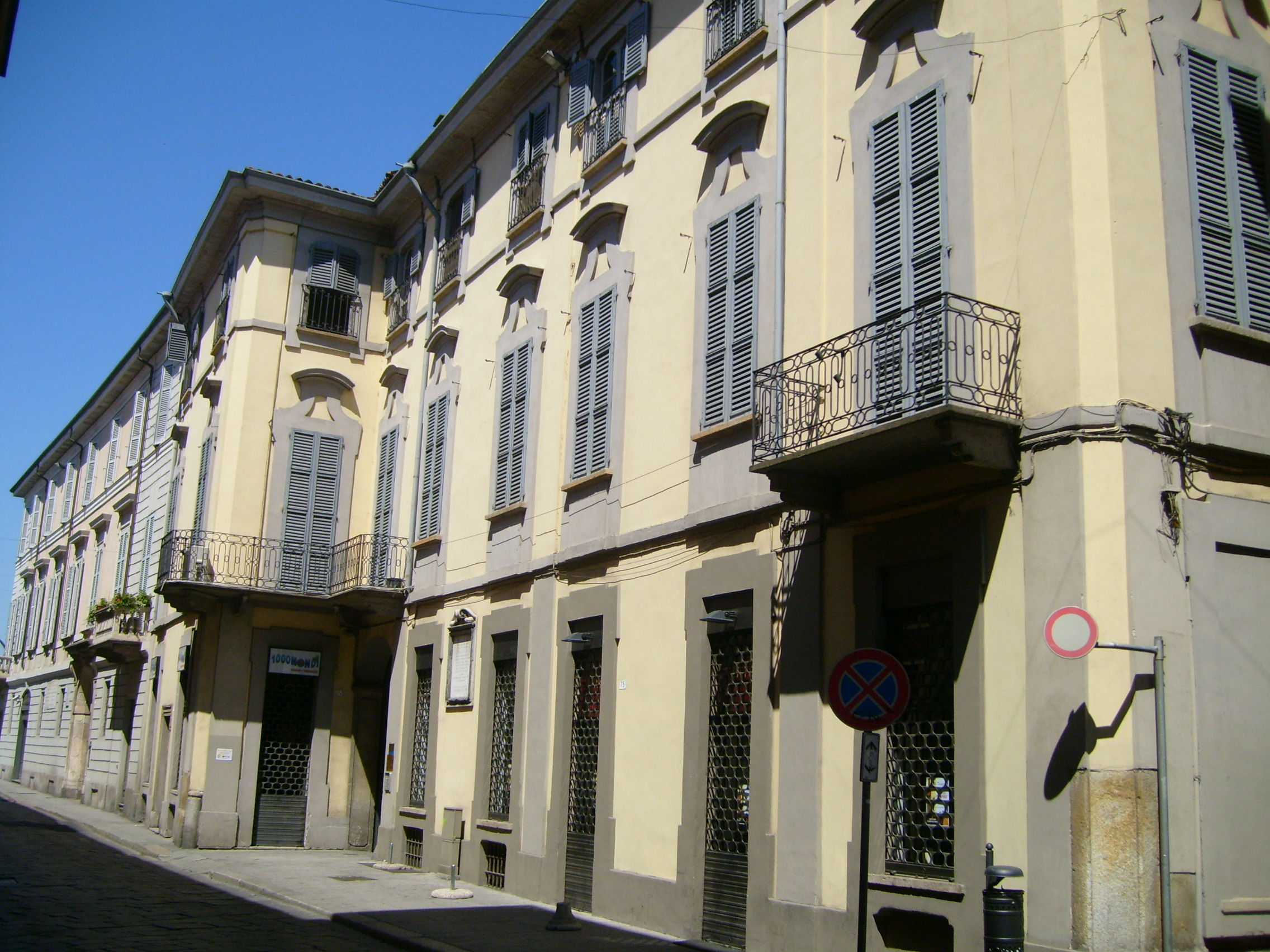
Camillo Golgi's house in Pavia

In Pavia several landmarks stand as Golgi's memory.

- A marble statue, in a yard of the old buildings of the University of Pavia, at N.65 of the central "Strada Nuova". On the basement, there is the following inscription in Italian language: "Camillo Golgi / patologo sommo / della scienza istologica / antesignano e maestro / la segreta struttura / del tessuto nervoso / con intenta vigilia / sorprese e descrisse / qui operò / qui vive / guida e luce ai venturi / MDCCCXLIII – MCMXXVI" (Camillo Golgi / outstanding pathologist / of histological science / precursor and master / the secret structure / of the nervous tissue / with strenuous effort / discovered and described / here he worked / here he lives / here he guides and enlightens future scholars / 1843 – 1926).
- "Golgi’s home", also in Strada Nuova, at N.77, a few hundred meters away from the University, just in front to the historical "Teatro Fraschini". It is the home in which Golgi spent the most of his family life, with his wife Lina.
- Golgi's tomb is in the Monumental Cemetery of Pavia (viale San Giovannino), along the central lane, just before the big monument to the fallen of the First World War. It is a very simple granite grave, with a bronze medallion representing the scientist's profile. Near Golgi's tomb, apart from his wife, two other important Italian medical scientists are buried: Bartolomeo Panizza and Adelchi Negri.
- Golgi's museum was created in 2012, in the ancient Palazzo Botta Adorno of the University of Pavia at N.10. of Piazza Antoniotto Botta Adornio with reconstructed study of Golgi and its laboratories with furniture and original instruments.

== Eponyms ==
- The organelle Golgi apparatus or Golgi complex
- The sensory receptor Golgi tendon organ
- Golgi's method or Golgi stain, a nervous tissue staining technique
- The enzyme Golgi alpha-mannosidase II
- Golgi cells of the cerebellum
- Golgi I nerve cells (with long axons)
- Golgi II nerve cells (with short or no axons)
- Golgi (crater), a lunar impact crater
- Minor planet 6875 Golgi is named after him.

== See also ==
- List of pathologists
