= Golgi's method =

Silver staining technique for visualizing nervous tissue under light microscopy

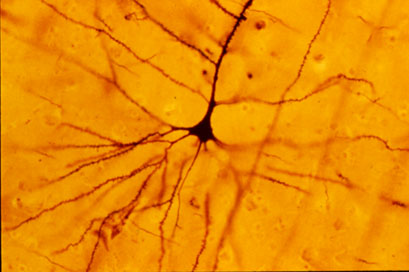
A human neocortical pyramidal neuron stained via Golgi technique. Notice the apical dendrite extending vertically above the soma and the numerous basal dendrites radiating laterally from the base of the cell body. Photo by Bob Jacobs, Colorado College.

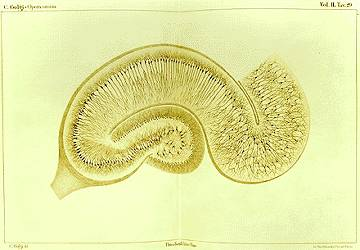
Drawing by Camillo Golgi of a hippocampus stained with the silver nitrate method

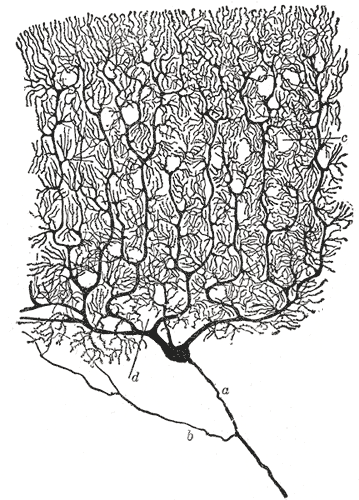
Drawing of a Purkinje cell in the cerebellum cortex done by Santiago Ramón y Cajal, clearly demonstrating the power of Golgi's staining method to reveal fine detail

Golgi's method is a silver staining technique that is used to visualize nervous tissue under light microscopy. The method was discovered by Camillo Golgi, an Italian physician and scientist, who published the first picture made with the technique in 1873. It was initially named the black reaction (la reazione nera) by Golgi, but it became better known as the Golgi stain or later, Golgi method. Golgi discovered this by introducing potassium and sodium into a chicken embryo.

Golgi staining was used by Spanish neuroanatomist Santiago Ramón y Cajal (1852–1934) to discover a number of novel facts about the organization of the nervous system, inspiring the birth of the neuron doctrine. Ultimately, Ramón y Cajal improved the technique by using a method he termed "double impregnation". Ramón y Cajal's staining technique, still in use, is called Cajal's stain.

== Mechanism ==
The cells in nervous tissue are densely packed, and little information on their structures and interconnections can be obtained if all the cells are stained. Furthermore, the thin filamentary extensions of neural cells, including the axon and the dendrites of neurons, are too slender and transparent to be seen with normal staining techniques. Golgi's method stains a limited number of cells at random in their entirety. The mechanism by which this happens is still largely unknown. Dendrites, as well as the cell soma, are clearly stained in brown and black and can be followed in their entire length, which allowed neuroanatomists to track connections between neurons and to make visible the complex networking structure of many parts of the brain and spinal cord.

Golgi's staining is achieved by impregnating aldehyde-fixed nervous tissue with potassium dichromate and silver nitrate. Cells thus stained are filled by microcrystallization of silver chromate.

== Technique ==
According to SynapseWeb, this is the recipe for Golgi's staining technique:

1. Immerse a block (approx. 10x5 mm) of formaldehyde-fixed (or paraformaldehyde- glutaraldehyde-perfused) brain tissue into a 2% aqueous solution of potassium dichromate for 2 days
2. Dry the block shortly with filter paper.
3. Immerse the block into a 2% aqueous solution of silver nitrate for another 2 days.
4. Cut sections approx. 20–100 μm thick.
5. Dehydrate quickly in ethanol, clear and mount (e.g., into Depex or Enthalan).

This technique has since been refined to substitute the silver precipitate with gold by immersing the sample in gold chloride then oxalic acid, followed by removal of the silver by sodium thiosulphate. This preserves a greater degree of fine structure with the ultrastructural details marked by small particles of gold.

Golgi staining has traditionally been performed on microtome-prepared sections, while its use in cryosectioning has been limited. Modified Golgi–Cox protocols with improved tissue protection was developed to facilitate cryosection application with maintaining reliable visualization of fine neuronal cytoarchitecture.

== Quote ==
Ramón y Cajal said of the Golgi method:

I expressed the surprise which I experienced upon seeing with my own eyes the wonderful revelatory powers of the chrome-silver reaction and the absence of any excitement in the scientific world aroused by its discovery.
Recuerdos de mi vida, Vol. 2, Historia de mi labor científica. Madrid: Moya, 1917, p. 76.
