= Jonathan Ashmore =

British physicist

Jonathan Ashmore FRS FMedSci FRSB
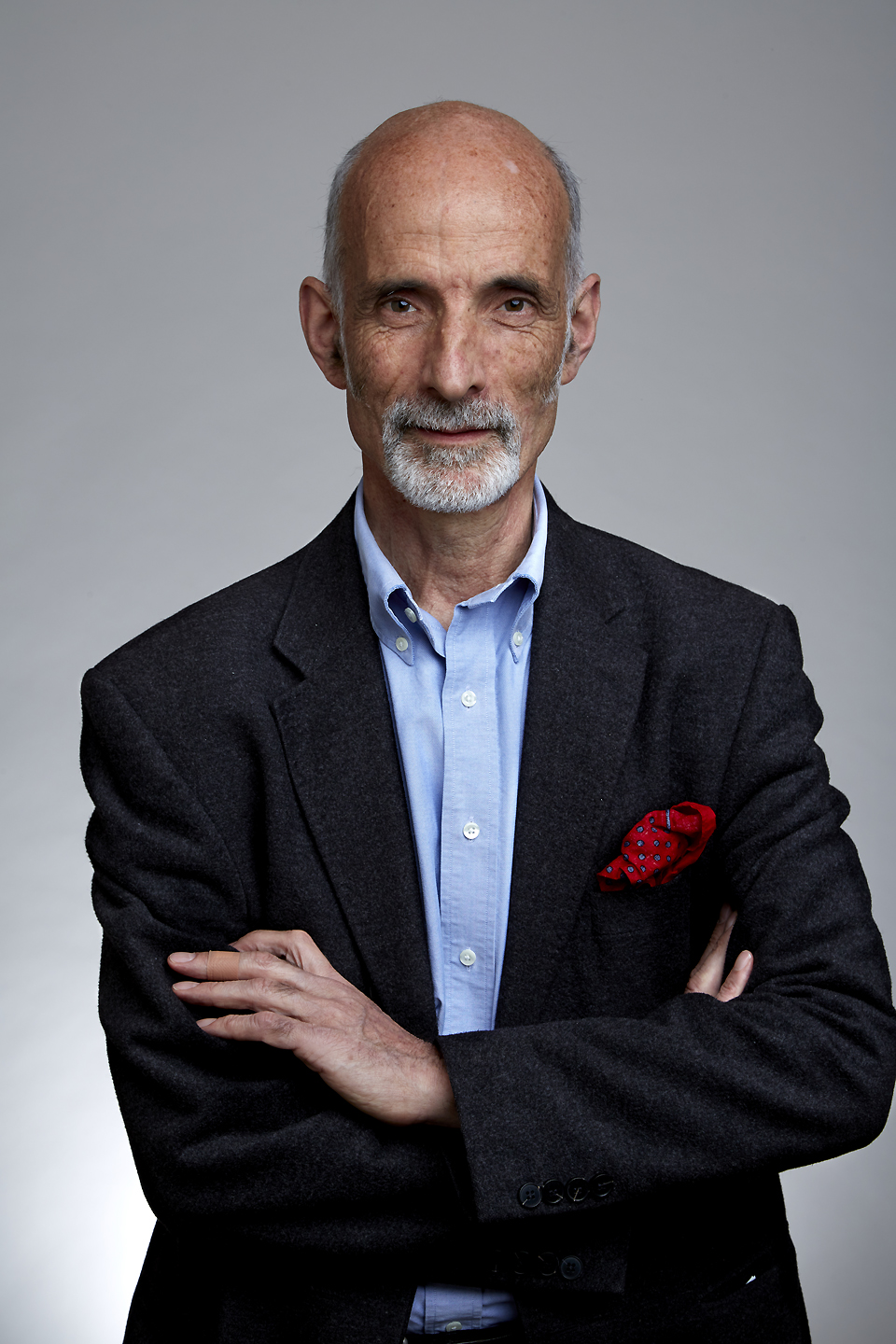
- Ashmore at the Royal Society in 2017
- Born: Jonathan Felix Ashmore; 1948 (age 77–78)
- Education: Westminster School; University of Sussex (BSc); Imperial College London (PhD); University College London (MSc)
- Relatives: Rosalie Crutchley (mother); Peter Ashmore (father)
- Awards: Croonian Lecture (2017)
- Scientific career
- Fields: Hearing; Biophysics
- Workplaces: University College London; University of Bristol; International Centre for Theoretical Physics
- Thesis: Aspects of quantum field theory (1972)
- Doctoral advisor: Tom Kibble
- Other academic advisors: Paul Fatt; Abdus Salam
- Website: inner-ear.org

Jonathan Felix Ashmore (born 1948) is a British physicist and Bernard Katz Professor of Biophysics at University College London.

== Early life and education ==
Ashmore is the son of theatre director and actor Peter Ashmore and the actress Rosalie Crutchley.

Aged seven, Ashmore played Joe in the 1955 film A Kid for Two Farthings, adapted from the novel by Wolf Mankowitz.

Educated at Westminster School as a Queen's Scholar, Ashmore studied mathematics and physics at the University of Sussex followed by a PhD in theoretical physics in 1971 supervised by Tom Kibble at Imperial College London where his research investigated quantum field theory.

== Career and research ==
After a short postdoctoral research fellowship supervised by Abdus Salam at the International Centre for Theoretical Physics in Trieste, Italy he retrained as a physiologist at UCL, gaining a Master of Science degree in 1974 which led to work with Paul Fatt and Gertrude Falk between 1974 and 1977 in the Biophysics Department.

Ashmore was appointed a Lecturer in Physiology at the University of Bristol in 1983 and promoted to Reader in 1988, before moving back to UCL in 1993.

Ashmore has worked on dissecting the cellular mechanisms of hearing by studying the organ of Corti in the mammalian cochlea especially the guinea pig (Cavia porcellus). This structure in the inner ear increases the selectivity and sensitivity of our hearing through an in-built cochlear amplifier. He showed that specialised cells known as outer hair cells are responsible for this unique function.

In response to sound, outer hair cells lengthen then shorten through a process controlled and powered by the flow of electrically charged molecules such as potassium ions. This contraction propagates and amplifies sound, and he was the first to capture it on film during his Rock Around the Clock Hair Cell video.

His work has combined biophysical methods – including the patch clamp technique usually applied to membrane proteins – with confocal microscopy imaging and computational modelling to expand our knowledge of hearing at the molecular and cellular level. His findings are helping to unravel the nature and origins of hearing-related conditions like deafness and tinnitus.

His research has been funded by the Biotechnology and Biological Sciences Research Council (BBSRC) and the Medical Research Council (MRC) and he has supervised several doctoral students to completion including Dan Jagger.

=== Awards and honours ===
Ashmore was elected a Fellow of the Royal Society (FRS) in 1996 and gave their Croonian Lecture in 2017 on the neuroscience of deafness. He is also an elected Fellow of the Academy of Medical Sciences (FMedSci), a Fellow of the Royal Society of Biology (FRSB) and a member of both the Association for Research in Otolaryngology and The Biophysical Society.

Ashmore is Faculty of 1000 section head for Sensory Systems and a trustee for the Hearing Research Trust. He served as president of The Physiological Society from 2012 to 2014.

== Personal life ==
Through his mother, Ashmore is descended from the 1st Earl of Leicester and his second wife, Lady Anne Amelia Keppel, a descendant of Charles II of England.
