= Quantal neurotransmitter release =

Quantal neurotransmitter release is the process by which neurons communicate by releasing neurotransmitters in discrete, measurable units known as quanta. Each quantum represents the contents of a single synaptic vesicle, which fuses with the presynaptic membrane to release neurotransmitters into the synaptic cleft. This process is tightly regulated by calcium ion signaling and specialized SNARE protein complexes that enable vesicle docking and fusion. Following release, synaptic vesicles are recycled through multiple pathways to maintain synaptic function. Disruptions in this mechanism are linked to neurological disorders such as autism spectrum disorder, Alzheimer's disease, and myasthenia gravis.

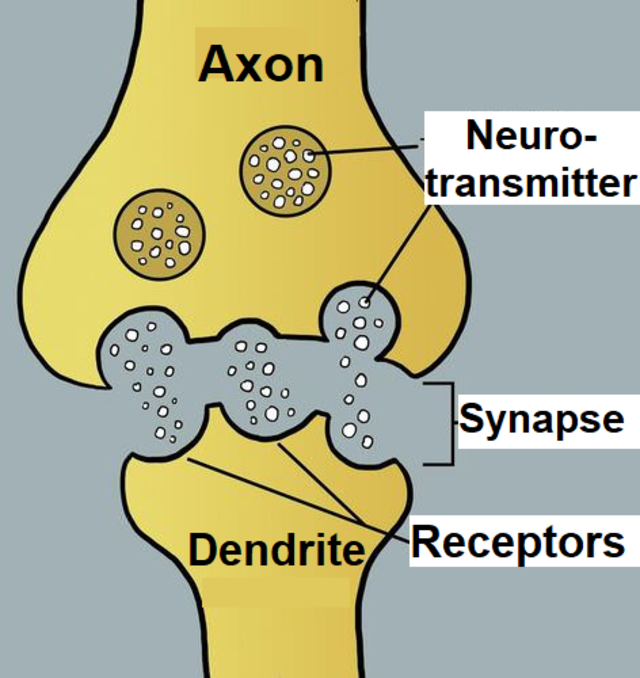
A brief overview of Neurotransmitter release

Neurotransmitters are released into the synapse in small packages called quanta, which are stored inside structures called synaptic vesicles. One quantum generates a miniature end plate potential (MEPP) which is the smallest amount of stimulation that one neuron can send to another neuron. Quantal release is the mechanism by which most traditional endogenous neurotransmitters are transmitted throughout the body. The aggregate sum of many MEPPs is an end plate potential (EPP). A normal end plate potential usually causes the postsynaptic neuron to reach its threshold of excitation and elicit an action potential. Electrical synapses do not use quantal neurotransmitter release and instead use gap junctions between neurons to send current flows between neurons. The goal of any synapse is to produce either an excitatory postsynaptic potential (EPSP) or an inhibitory postsynaptic potential (IPSP), which generate or repress the expression, respectively, of an action potential in the postsynaptic neuron. It is estimated that an action potential will trigger the release of approximately 20% of an axon terminal's neurotransmitter load.

== Quantal neurotransmitter release mechanism ==
=== Neurotransmitter synthesis and packaging ===
Neurotransmitters are synthesized in the axon terminal where they are stored in vesicles. These neurotransmitter-filled vesicles are the quanta that will be released into the synapse. Quantal vesicles release their contents into the synapse by binding to the presynaptic membrane and combining their phospholipid bilayers. Individual quanta may randomly diffuse into the synapse and cause a subsequent MEPP. Spontaneous release happens randomly, without being triggered by a signal or action potential.

=== Calcium signaling and vesicle fusion ===
Spontaneous neurotransmitter release occurs randomly, independent of Ca^{2+} influx, while evoked release is action potential-dependent and triggered by calcium channel activation. The differential regulation of these two forms of release contributes to synaptic plasticity and fine-tuning of neuronal communication.

Calcium ion signaling to the axon terminal is the usual signal for presynaptic release of neurotransmitters. Calcium ion diffusion into the presynaptic membrane signals the axon terminal to release quanta to generate either an IPSP or EPSP in the postsynaptic membrane. Different neurotransmitters cause different effects on the postsynaptic neuron, either exciting or inhibiting it. Action potentials that transmit down to the axon terminal will depolarize the terminal's membrane and cause a conformational change in the membrane's calcium ion channels. These calcium channels will adopt an "open" configuration that will allow only calcium ions to enter the axon terminal. The influx of calcium ions will further depolarize the interior of the axon terminal and will signal the quanta in the axon terminal to bind to the presynaptic membrane. Once bound, the vesicles will fuse into the membrane and the neurotransmitters will be released into the membrane by exocytosis.

=== SNARE complex and synaptotagmin ===
When an action potential reaches the axon terminal, it causes calcium ions to flow into the neuron through voltage-gated calcium channels. These calcium ions bind to a protein called synaptotagmin, which acts as a calcium sensor. Once bound to calcium, synaptotagmin interacts with the SNARE complex, a group of proteins that includes synaptobrevin, syntaxin, and SNAP-25. Together, these proteins pull the synaptic vesicle close to the presynaptic membrane and promote membrane fusion. This fusion releases the vesicle’s neurotransmitter content into the synaptic cleft in a process known as exocytosis. The SNARE complex ensures that neurotransmitter release is rapid and tightly controlled, allowing neurons to communicate with high precision.

=== Spontaneous vs. evoked release ===
Neurotransmitter release occurs in two forms: spontaneous release and evoked release. Spontaneous release happens without any stimulation from an action potential. Instead, single vesicles randomly fuse with the presynaptic membrane, likely due to baseline activity in the nerve terminal. This form of release plays a role in maintaining synaptic structure and modulating baseline neuronal activity. In contrast, evoked release is triggered by an action potential. When the action potential reaches the axon terminal, it opens voltage-gated calcium channels, allowing calcium ions to enter. The sudden increase in intracellular calcium concentration activates the SNARE complex and leads to rapid, synchronized fusion of multiple vesicles. Evoked release is responsible for fast synaptic transmission and is essential for most forms of information transfer between neurons.

While the basic calcium-triggered mechanism for evoked release is well understood, the precise signaling hierarchy among calcium channels and receptors in the presynaptic membrane remains under investigation. Research suggests that different calcium channel types vary in their excitability and efficiency, with certain channels being preferentially activated to regulate the strength and timing of quantal release.

Estimating the time course of quantal release—how quickly and reliably vesicles fuse after stimulation—has been a valuable tool for studying synaptic function. While this approach is not equally effective across all types of synapses, it has provided insights into how the kinetics of release can vary depending on presynaptic architecture and receptor distribution.

=== Synaptic vesicle pools ===
Synaptic vesicles are organized into functionally distinct pools that regulate neurotransmitter availability during synaptic activity:

- Readily Releasable Pool (RRP): Vesicles docked at the membrane, primed for immediate fusion.
- Reserve Pool: Vesicles that replenish the RRP during sustained activity.
- Recycling Pool: Vesicles that have undergone endocytosis and are refilled for reuse.

These vesicle pools work together to ensure reliable neurotransmission. The Readily Releasable Pool (RRP) supports fast, immediate communication by providing vesicles that are already docked at the membrane and ready to fuse. During sustained or intense neural activity, vesicles from the Reserve Pool are recruited to maintain neurotransmitter output. After vesicles release their contents, they enter the Recycling Pool, where they are reprocessed and prepared for future use. This dynamic system allows the synapse to quickly adapt to changing activity levels and maintain efficiency. Disruption in vesicle pool regulation can impair synaptic strength and contribute to neurological dysfunction.

== Synaptic vesicle recycling ==
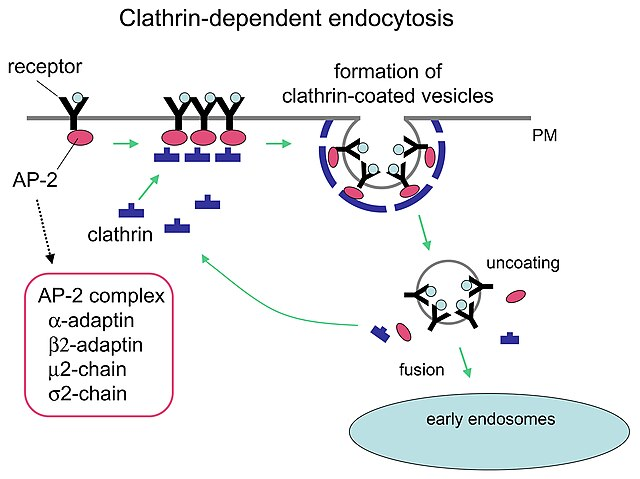
A general overview of Clathrin-mediated endocytosis, one of the common methods for vesicle recycling.

As described above, the synaptic vesicle will remain fused to the presynaptic membrane after its neurotransmitter contents have been released into the synapse. If vesicles weren’t recycled, the axon terminal membrane would keep expanding and disrupt normal synaptic function. The axon terminal compensates for this problem by reuptaking the vesicle by endocytosis and reusing its components to form new synaptic vesicles. The exact mechanism and signaling cascade which triggers synaptic vesicle recycling is still unknown.

No one method of synaptic vesicle recycling seems to hold true in all scenarios, which suggests the existence of multiple pathways for synaptic vesicle recycling. Multiple proteins have been linked with synaptic vesicle reuptake and then subsequently been linked to different synaptic vesicle recycling pathways. Clathrin-mediated endocytosis (CME) and activity-dependent bulk endocytosis (ADBE) are the two most predominant forms of synaptic vesicle recycling, with ADBE being more active during periods of high neuronal activity and CME being active for long periods of time after neuronal activity has ceased.

Synaptic vesicles are retrieved through two primary pathways:

- Clathrin-mediated endocytosis (CME): A slow, precise process that recycles vesicles using clathrin-coated pits.
- Activity-dependent bulk endocytosis (ADBE): A rapid pathway that retrieves large portions of membrane during high activity.

The interaction between dynamin and syndapin, as described by Clayton et al. (2009), plays a key role in regulating both CME and ADBE. This regulation is activity-dependent: during low-frequency stimulation, CME ensures precise vesicle recycling, while during intense neuronal activity, ADBE provides a rapid, large-scale retrieval system to prevent membrane buildup. The balance between these two pathways allows neurons to adapt to different levels of synaptic demand and maintain transmission fidelity across a wide range of firing conditions.

== History ==
The theory of Quantal neurotransmitter release was developed by Katz and Fatt in early 1950s following their experiments on frog neuromuscular junction.

== Clinical Relevance ==
Disruptions in quantal neurotransmitter release are implicated in several neurological disorders:[6]

- Autism Spectrum Disorder (ASD): Altered synaptic vesicle cycling has been linked to ASD, affecting synaptic communication and neural circuit function.
- Neurodegenerative Diseases: Abnormalities in neurotransmitter release contribute to diseases like Alzheimer’s and Parkinson’s.
- Myasthenia Gravis: Impaired quantal release at neuromuscular junctions leads to muscle weakness and fatigue.

Understanding these processes at the molecular level helps in the development of therapeutic interventions targeting synaptic dysfunction.

Disruptions in quantal neurotransmitter release are implicated in several neurological and neurodevelopmental disorders. In autism spectrum disorder (ASD), altered synaptic vesicle cycling and imbalances in spontaneous vs. evoked neurotransmitter release have been linked to abnormal neuronal connectivity and impaired social behavior. Studies in model organisms suggest that synaptic dysfunction may underlie both the cognitive symptoms and the frequent co-occurrence of sleep disturbances observed in ASD patients.

In neurodegenerative diseases such as Alzheimer’s and Parkinson’s, evidence shows that impaired vesicle trafficking and neurotransmitter release contribute to synaptic failure and progressive neuronal loss. Early disruption in synaptic function is now recognized as a hallmark of these diseases, often preceding large-scale cell death.

Additionally, in myasthenia gravis, a disorder of the neuromuscular junction, reduced quantal content and impaired synaptic transmission lead to characteristic muscle weakness and fatigue. Understanding the molecular underpinnings of quantal release has helped guide therapeutic strategies targeting synaptic efficiency and receptor sensitivity.
