= Presynaptic inhibition =

A circuit diagram of postsynaptic inhibition (A, B) and presynaptic inhibition (C). Excitation is shown in green and inhibition is shown in red.

Presynaptic inhibition is a phenomenon in which an inhibitory neuron provides synaptic input to the axon of another neuron (axo-axonal synapse) to make it less likely to fire an action potential. Presynaptic inhibition occurs when an inhibitory neurotransmitter, like GABA, acts on GABA receptors on the axon terminal. Or when endocannabinoids act as retrograde messengers by binding to presynaptic CB1 receptors, thereby indirectly modulating GABA and the excitability of dopamine neurons by reducing it and other presynaptic released neurotransmitters. Presynaptic inhibition is ubiquitous among sensory neurons.

== Function ==
Sensory stimuli, such as pain, proprioception, and somatosensation, are sensed by primary afferent fibers. Somatosensory neurons encode information about the body's current state (e.g. temperature, pain, pressure, position, etc.). For vertebrate animals, these primary afferent fibers form synapses onto the spinal cord, specifically in the dorsal horn area, onto a variety of downstream targets including both excitatory neurons and inhibitory neurons. Synapses between primary afferent fibers and their targets are the first opportunity for sensory information to be modulated. Primary afferent fibers contain many receptors along their projections, making them amenable to complex modulation. The constant influx of environmental stimuli, as sensed by primary afferent fibers, is subject to modulation to enhance or diminish stimuli (see also: gate control theory and gain control-biological). Because there are essentially unlimited stimuli, it is imperative that these signals are appropriately filtered.

To test whether somatosensation, specifically pain, was subjected to inhibition, scientists injected a chemical into the spinal cord of a rodent to block the primary inhibitory neurotransmitter's activity (bicuculline, a GABA receptor agonist). They found that pharmacologically blocking GABA receptors actually enhanced the perception of pain; in other words, GABA usually diminishes the perception of pain.

The method by which GABA modulates synaptic transmission from primary afferent fibers to their downstream targets is disputed (see Mechanisms section below). Regardless of the mechanics, GABA acts in an inhibitory role to reduce the likelihood of primary afferent fiber synaptic release.

Modulating primary afferent fibers is critical to maintain general comfort. One study showed that animals without a specific type of GABA receptor on their nociceptors were hypersensitive to pain, thus supporting a function of presynaptic inhibition as an analgesic. Certain pathological conditions, such as allodynia, are thought to be caused by non-modulated nociceptor firing. In addition to dampening pain, impaired presynaptic inhibition has been implicated in many neurological disorders, such as spasticity after spinal cord injury, epilepsy, autism, and fragile-X syndrome.

== Mechanisms ==
Primary sensory afferents contain GABA receptors along their terminals (reviewed in:, Table 1). GABA receptors are ligand-gated chloride channels, formed by the assembly of five GABA receptor subunits. In addition to the presence of GABA receptors along sensory afferent axons, the presynaptic terminal also has a distinct ionic composition that is high in chloride concentration. This is due to cation-chloride cotransporters (for example, NKCC1) that maintain highs intracellular chloride.

Typically when GABA receptors are activated, it causes a chloride influx, which hyperpolarizes the cell. However, in primary afferent fibers, due to the high concentration of chloride at the presynaptic terminal and thus its altered reversal potential, GABA receptor activation actually results in a chloride efflux, and thus a resulting depolarization. This phenomenon is called primary afferent depolarization (PAD). The GABA-induced depolarized potential at afferent axons has been demonstrated in many animals from cats to insects. Interestingly, despite the depolarized potential, GABA receptor activation along the axon still results in a reduction of neurotransmitter release and thus still is inhibitory.

There are four hypotheses which propose mechanisms behind this paradox:

1. The depolarized membrane causes inactivation of voltage-gated sodium channels on the terminals and therefore the action potential is prevented from propagating.
2. Open GABA receptor channels act as a shunt, whereby current is dissipated of instead of being propagated to the terminals.
3. The depolarized membrane causes inactivation of voltage-gated calcium channels, preventing calcium influx at the synapse (which is imperative for neurotransmission).
4. The depolarization at the terminals generates an antidromic spike (i.e. an action potential generated in the axon and travels towards the soma), which would prevent orthodromic spikes (i.e. an action potential traveling from the cell's soma toward the axon terminals) from propagating.

== History of the discovery of presynaptic inhibition ==
1933: Grasser & Graham observed depolarization that originated in the sensory axon terminals

1938: Baron & Matthews observed depolarization that originated in sensory axon terminals and the ventral root

1957: Frank & Fuortes coined the term "presynaptic inhibition"

1961: Eccles, Eccles, & Magni determined that the Dorsal Root Potential (DRP) originated from depolarization in sensory axon terminals
