= Gertrude Falk =

American physiologist

- Born: August 24, 1925; Brooklyn, New York City, United States
- Died: March 9, 2008 (aged 82); London, England, United Kingdom
- Education: Antioch College; University of Chicago
- Spouse: Paul Fatt
- Children: 1
- Awards: Guggenheim Fellowship
- Scientific career
- Fields: Photoreceptor cells
- Workplaces: University of Illinois College of Medicine; University of Washington; UCL Medical School

Gertrude Falk (August 24, 1925 – March 9, 2008) was an American physiologist, who was Professor of Physiology at University College London, and the first woman to work in her field at UCL Medical School. Born to immigrant parents in the United States, she was the first in her family to enroll at university, earning Bachelor of Science and Doctor of Philosophy degrees. Falk worked at the University of Illinois College of Medicine, University of Washington and UCL Medical School. She and neuroscientist Paul Fatt researched cellular biophysics to find how the retina converts light into electrical signals, and later worked alongside Jonathan Ashmore in demonstrating that light responses can be increased significantly at the synthase between the rod bipolar cell and photoreceptor cell.

== Biography ==
Gertrude Falk was born in Brooklyn, New York City on August 24, 1925. Her mother was a Lithuanian Jew who entered the United States at the age of 16, only able to speak Yiddish, and her immigrant father operated a furrier shop during the Great Depression. Falk had one sister. She worked as a guard at her father's shop, and helped him to conceal non-unionized workers in the cupboard when inspectors visited the shop. Falk expressed a desire to enroll at university though her traditionalist parents objected to this. Nevertheless, she became the first member of her family to attend university by enrolling at Antioch College, Ohio, one of the few universities not to bar black students or impose quotas on Jews. Falk graduated from the college with a Bachelor of Science in 1947. She went on to study at University of Chicago, undertaking postgraduate research on diuresis (the increase in production of urine by a rat's kidneys), earning her a Doctor of Philosophy (PhD).

== Research ==
Falk began her academic career at the University of Illinois College of Medicine, where she worked from 1952 to 1953, before moving to the University of Chicago as an instructor in natural science between 1953 and 1954. She moved to the University of Washington, Seattle in 1954, working as an instructor, and later as assistant to the professor of paracetamol. Falk left the University of Washington in 1961. That year, she flew to England as a Guggenheim Fellow to join the biophysics department of UCL Medical School, becoming the first woman to hold a professional chair at the department. There, Falk worked on the high capacitance of human muscle with a colleague, neuroscientist Paul Fatt. The pair utilized two-electrode recording techniques, which required a deep comprehension of biophysics. Those experiments helped to explain how the retina converts light into electrical signals. A conclusion was reached the internal membranes accounted for the same high capacitance.

She also worked with Andrew Fielding Huxley in 1963 and Bernard Katz in 1970. Falk and Fatt later researched cellular biophysics to increase awareness of phototransduction of the retina. In 1974, Falk and physicist Jonathan Ashmore worked on a post-doctorate to demonstrate that light responses can be increased significantly at the synthase between the rod bipolar cell and photoreceptor cell. Throughout the 1990s, she and Richard Shiells pioneered the use of microelectrodes to analyse a single bipolar cell.

== Political activism ==
Outside her academic work, Falk was a decades-long member of the Hampstead Labour Party, working in campaigning and fundraising from her home in Hampstead Hill Gardens. However, she was opposed to the 2003 invasion of Iraq and New Labour, which fellow party members described as "the party moved away from her." Falk heavily campaigned in support of the National Health Service (NHS), and she protested against a perceived threat to privatize it, which she feared would create a situation in which there would be an "Americanised service, where people will have to pay for healthcare through insurance, as has happened with dentists in this country".

She was a signatory to British Friends of Peace Now and Jews for Justice for Palestinians, and was a treasurer for Mapam UK (now Meretz UK). Falk was a strong supporter of Israel and the withdrawal of its military forces from the West Bank and the Gaza Strip. In 2007, Falk wrote to Camden New Journal about the cuts to the mental health service budget to hospitals in Camden Town. She and two personal friends spent much of the year protesting outside the Royal Free Hospital. Falk died after a short illness on March 9, 2008, and she was given a funeral in Golders Green on March 17.

== Personality and personal life ==
Falk was described by Lawrence Joffe of The Guardian as "small of stature" and "a legendary conversationalist". She was outspoken, had a sense of humor, sympathy for those individuals considered the underdog, and friends and colleagues called her "a generous, warm and intellectually challenging person." Falk was married to Paul Fatt, with whom she had a daughter; the two remained on amicable terms after they were divorced.

== Legacy ==
The STS Gertrude Falk Prize was established by the University College London in her honor to award the "top overall performance through any STS iBSc year".

== Selected publications ==
- Shiells, R. A.; Falk, Gertrude; Naghshineh, S. (February 22, 1986). "Iontophoretic Study of the Action of Excitatory Amino Acids on Rod Horizontal Cells of the Dogfish Retina". Proceedings of the Royal Society of London. Series B, Biological Sciences. 226 (1246). Royal Society: 121–135. Bibcode:1986RSPSB.227..121S. doi:10.1098/rspb.1986.0013. ISSN 0080-4649. JSTOR 36052. S2CID 84786775.
