= Axo-axonic synapse =

Type of synapse

An axo-axonic synapse is a type of synapse, formed by one neuron projecting its axon terminals onto another neuron's axon.

Axo-axonic synapses have been found and described more recently than the other more familiar types of synapses, such as axo-dendritic synapses and axo-somatic synapses. The spatio-temporal properties of neurons get altered by the type of synapse formed between neurons. Unlike the other types, the axo-axonic synapse does not contribute towards triggering an action potential in the postsynaptic neuron. Instead, it affects the probability of neurotransmitter release in the response to any action potential passing through the axon of the postsynaptic neuron. Thus, axo-axonic synapses appear to be very important for the brain in achieving a specialized neural computation.

Axo-axonic synapses are found throughout the central nervous system, including in the hippocampus, cerebral cortex and striatum in mammals; in the neuro-muscular junctions in crustaceans; and in the visual circuitry in dipterans. Axo-axonic synapses can induce either inhibitory or excitatory effects in the postsynaptic neuron. A classic example of the role of axo-axonic synapses is causing inhibitory effects on motoneurons in the spinal-somatic reflex arc. This phenomenon is known as presynaptic-inhibition.

== Background ==
Illustration of the axo-axonic synapse formed between the terminal of presynaptic neuron and the axon of postsynaptic neuron.

Complex interconnections of neurons form neural networks, which are responsible for various types of computation in the brain. Neurons receive inputs mainly through dendrites, which play a role in spatio-temporal computation, leading to the firing of an action potential which subsequently travels to synaptic terminals passing through axons. Based on their locations, synapses can be classified into various kinds, such as axo-dendritic synapse, axo-somatic synapse, and axo-axonal synapse. The prefix here indicates the part of the presynaptic neuron (i.e., ‘axo-’ for axons), and the suffix represents the location where the synapse is formed on the postsynaptic neuron (i.e., ‘-dendritic’ for dendrites, ‘-somatic’ for cell body and ‘-axonic’ for synapses on axons). Synapse location will govern the role of that synapse in a network of neurons. In axo-dendritic synapses, the presynaptic activity will affect the spatio-temporal computation in postsynaptic neurons by altering electrical potential in the dendritic branch. Whereas the axo-somatic synapse will affect the probability of firing an action potential in the postsynaptic neuron by causing inhibitory or excitatory effects directly at the cell body.

Whereas the other types of synapses modulate postsynaptic neural activity, the axo-axonic synapses show subtle effects on the network-level neural information transfer. In such synapses, the activity in presynaptic neurons will not change the membrane potential (i.e., depolarize or hyperpolarize) of the cell body of postsynaptic neurons because presynaptic neurons project directly on the axons of the postsynaptic neurons. Thus, the axo-axonic synapse will mainly affect the probability of neurotransmitter vesicle release in response to an action potential firing in the postsynaptic neuron. Unlike other kinds of synapses, the axo-axonic synapse manipulates the effects of a postsynaptic neuron's firing on the neurons further downstream in the network. Due to the mechanism of how axo-axonic synapses work, most of these synapses are inhibitory, and yet a few show excitatory effects in postsynaptic neurons.

== History ==
The first direct evidence of the existence of axo-axonic synapses was provided by E. G. Gray in 1962. Gray produced electron microscopy photographs of axo-axonic synapses formed on the terminals of muscle afferents involved in the spinal somatic reflex arc in a cat's spinal cord slices. Later, Gray coined the term ‘axo-axonic’ after getting photographic confirmation from as many as twelve axo-axonic synapses. Within the next two years, scientists found axo-axonic synapses in various other places in the nervous system in different animals, such as in the retina of cats and pigeons, in the lateral geniculate nucleus of monkeys, in the olfactory bulb of mice, and in various lobes in the octopus brain. This further confirmed the existence of axo-axonic synapses in the brain across animal phyla.

Prior to the discovery of axo-axonic synapses, physiologists predicted the possibility of such mechanisms as early as in year 1935, following their observations of electrophysiological recordings and quantal analysis of brain segments. They had observed inhibitory responses in postsynaptic motoneurons in the slice preparation of the monosynaptic reflex arc. During simultaneous recordings from presynaptic and postsynaptic neurons, the physiologists could not make sense of the infrequent inhibition observed in the postsynaptic neuron, with no membrane potential changes in the presynaptic neuron. At that time, this phenomenon was known as “presynaptic inhibitory action”, the term proposed by Karl Frank in 1959 and later well summarized by John Eccles in his book. After Gray's finding of the axo-axonic synapse in 1962, scientists confirmed that this phenomenon was in fact due to the axo-axonic synapse present in the reflex arc.

More recently, in 2006 researchers discovered the first evidence of excitatory effects caused by an axo-axonic synapse. They found that GABAergic neurons project onto the axons of pyramidal cells in the cerebral cortex to form axo-axonic synapse and elicit excitatory effects in cortical microcircuits.

== Function ==
Below are the brain locations where axo-axonic synapses are found in different animals.

=== Cerebellar cortex ===
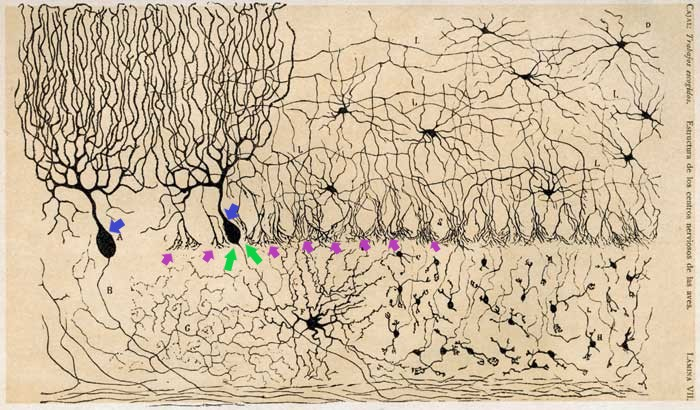
Drawing of the cerebellar cortex, showing axo-axonic synapses (green) formed by Basket cell projections (pink) onto Purkinje cells (blue) at the axon hillock.

The axo-axonic synapse in the cerebellar cortex originally appeared in one of the drawings of Santiago Ramón y Cajal in his book published in 1909. Later using electron microscopy, it was confirmed that the basket cell axon projects on the axon hillock of Purkinje cells in the cerebellar cortex in cats and other mammals, forming axo-axonic synapses. The first electrophysiological characterization of an axo-axonic synapse formed on Purkinje cells was done in 1963, where the presynaptic basket cell axons were found to inhibit the terminal output of postsynaptic Purkinje cells through the axo-axonic synapse. Network-level study revealed that the granule cells which, through their parallel fibers, activate Purkinje cells, also activate the basket cells, which subsequently inhibit the effect of Purkinje cells on the downstream network.

=== Cerebral cortex ===
Axo-axonic synapses are found In the visual cortex (in V1 and V2) in mammals, and have been well studied in cats, rats and primates such as monkeys. The synapse is formed on the initial segments of the axons of pyramidal cells in several layers in the visual cortex. The projecting neurons for these synapses come from various parts of the central nervous system and neocortex. Similarly, axo-axonic synapses are found in the motor cortex, in the subiculum and in the piriform cortex. In the striate cortex, as the Golgi's method and electron microscopy revealed, as many as five axo-axonic synapses are formed onto a single pyramidal cell. In the cerebral cortex, inhibitory axo-axonic synapses may play a widespread role in network level activity by enabling synchronized firing of pyramidal cells, essentially by modulating the threshold for output of these cells. These synapses are also found on the initial segments of axons in pyramidal cells in the somatosensory cortex, and in the primary olfactory cortex which are found to be the inhibitory kind. Studying the locations of axo-axonic synapses in the primary olfactory cortex, researchers have suggested that axo-axonic synapses may play a critical role in synchronizing oscillations in the piriform cortex (in the olfactory cortex), which aids olfaction. The axo-axonic synapses are also found in the hippocampus. These synapses are found to be formed mainly on principal cells in stratum oriens and stratum pyramidale and rarely on stratum radiatum; they commonly receive projections from GABAergic local interneurons. The horizontal interneurons show a laminar distribution of dendrites and are involved in axo-axonic synapses in the hippocampus, which get direct synaptic inputs from CA1 pyramidal cells. Thus, in general, these studies indicate that axo-axonic synapses can provide a basic mechanism of information processing in the cerebral cortex.

=== Basal ganglia ===
Microscopy studies in the striatum previously suggested rare occurrence of axo-axonic synapses in individual sections. Extrapolations from the topological data suggest much higher counts of such synapses in the striatum where the therapeutic role of the axo-axonic synapses in treating schizophrenia has been postulated previously. In this study, authors examined 4,811 synapses in rat striatum sections, and 15 of them were found to be the axo-axonic synapses. These axo-axonic synapses are formed by dopaminergic inhibitory interneurons (on the presynaptic side) projecting onto the axons of glutamatergic cortico-striatal fibers in the rat striatum.

=== Brainstem ===
Axo-axonic synapses are found in the spinal trigeminal nucleus in the brainstem. Electron microscopy studies on the kitten brainstem quantified synaptogenesis of axo-axonic synapses in the spinal trigeminal nucleus at different development ages of the brain. Authors identified the synapses by counting vesicles released in the synaptic cleft, which can be observed in the micrographs. Axo-axonic contacts are shown to consistently increase throughout the development period, starting from the age of 3 hours to the age of 27 days in kittens. The highest rate of synaptogenesis is during the first 3 to 6 days, at the end of which, the kitten's spinal trigeminal nucleus will have nearly half of the axo-axonic synapses present in adult cats. Later, between 16 and 27 days of age, there is another surge of axo-axonic synaptogenesis. Axo-axonic synapses are also observed in the solitary nucleus (also known as nucleus of the solitary tract) uniquely in the commissural portion in the neuroanatomical studies, which used 5-hydroxydopamine to label axo-axonic synapses. Axo-axonic synapses are formed on baroreceptor terminals by the presynaptic adrenergic fibers, and are proposed to play a role in baroreflex.

=== Spinal Cord ===
Axo-axonic synapses are found in the mammalian spinal reflex arc and in Substantia gelatinosa of Rolando (SGR). In the spinal cord, axo-axonic synapses are formed on the terminals of sensory neurons with presynaptic inhibitory interneurons. These synapses are first studied using intracellular recordings from the spinal motoneurons in cats, and have been shown to cause presynaptic inhibition. This seems to be a common mechanism in spinal cords, in which GABAergic interneurons inhibit presynaptic activity in sensory neurons and eventually control activity in motor neurons enabling selective control of muscles. In efforts to quantify the occurrence of axo-axonic synapses in the SGR region in rats, 54 such synapses were found among the total 6,045 synapses examined. These 54 axo-axonic synapses were shown to have either agranular vesicles or large granular vesicles.

=== Vestibular system ===
Axo-axonic synapses are found in the lateral vestibular nucleus in rats. Axo-axonic synapses are formed from the small axons of interneurons onto the axon terminals of large axons, which are upstream to the main dendritic stem. Interestingly, the authors claimed that axo-axonic synapses, which are abundant in rats, are absent in the lateral vestibular nucleus in cats. They note that the types of axon terminals identified and described in cats are all found in rats, but the reverse is not true because the axons forming the axo-axonic synapses are missing in cats. These synapses are proposed to enable complex neural computation for the vestibular reflex in rats.

=== Hindbrain ===
Axo-axonic synapses are found in the mauthner cells in goldfish. The axon hillock and initial axon segments of mauthner cells receive terminals from extremely fine unmyelinated fibers, which cover the axon hillock with helical projections. These helical projections around mauthner cells are also known as the axon cap. The difference between the axo-axonic synapses and other synapses on mauthner cells is that synapses on dendrites and soma receive myelinated fibers, while axons receive unmyelinated fibers. Mauthner cells are big neurons which are involved in fast escape reflexes in fish. Thus, these axo-axonic synapses could selectively disable the escape network by controlling the effect of mauthner cells on the neural network further downstream. Studying the morphological variation of the axo-axonic synapses at the axon hillock in mauthner cells suggests that, evolutionarily, these synapses are more recent than the mauthner cells. Response to the startle can be mapped phylogenetically, which confirms that basal actinopterygian fish, with little to no axo-axonic synapses on mauthner cells, show worse escape response than fish with axo-axonic synapses.

=== Neuromuscular junction ===
Inhibitory axo-axonic synapses are found in the crustacean neuromuscular junctions and have been widely studied in Crayfish. Axo-axonic synapses are formed on the excitatory axons as a postsynaptic neuron by the motor neurons from the presynaptic side. Motor neurons, which is the common inhibitor in crab limb closers and limb accessory flexors, form axo-axonic synapses in addition to the neuromuscular junction with the muscles in crayfish. These synapses were first observed in 1967, when they were found to cause presynaptic inhibition in leg muscles of crayfish and crabs. Subsequent studies found that axo-axonic synapses showed varying numbers of occurrence based on the location of the leg muscles from the nervous system. For instance, proximal regions have thrice as many axo-axonic synapses than the central regions. These synapses are proposed to function by limiting neurotransmitter release for controlled leg movements.

== Clinical Significance ==
An example of the physiological role of axo-axonic synapses, which are formed by GABAergic inhibitory interneurons to the axons of granule cells, is in eliciting spontaneous seizures, which is a key symptom of Intractable Epilepsy. The presynaptic inhibitory interneurons, which can be labeled by cholecystokinin and GAT-1, are found to modulate the granule cells's spike output. The same cells subsequently project excitatory mossy fibers to pyramidal neurons in the hippocampal CA3 region.

One of the two leading theories for the pathoetiology of schizophrenia is the glutamate theory. Glutamate is a well studied neurotransmitter for its role in learning and memory, and also in the brain development during prenatal and childhood. Studies of rat striatum found inhibitory axo-axonic synapses formed on the glutamatergic cortico-striatal fibers. They proposed that these axo-axonic synapses in the striatum could be responsible for inhibiting the glutamatergic neurons. Additionally, these dopaminergic synapses are also proposed to cause hyperdopaminergic activity and become neurotoxic for the postsynaptic glutamatergic neurons. This mechanism is proposed to be a possible mechanism for glutamate dysfunction in observed schizophrenia.

== Development ==
A study on the spinal cord in mice suggests that the sensory Ig/Caspr4 complex is involved in the formation of axo-axonic synapses on proprioceptive afferents. These synapses are formed through projection of GABAergic interneurons on sensory neurons, which is upstream to the motor neurons. In the axo-axonic synapse, expressing NB2 (Contactin5)/Caspr4 coreceptor complex in postsynaptic neurons along with expressing NrCAM/CHL1 in presynaptic interneurons results in the increased numbers of such synapses forming in the spinal cord. Also, knocking out NB2 from the sensory neurons reduced the number of axo-axonic synapses from GABAergic interneurons, which suggests the necessity and the role of NB2 in synaptogenesis of axo-axonic type of synapses.

== See also ==
- Synapse
- Synaptic plasticity
- Neural computation
- Dendrodendritic synapse
