= Cytosis =

Biological suffix denoting cellular transport processes or abnormal cell counts

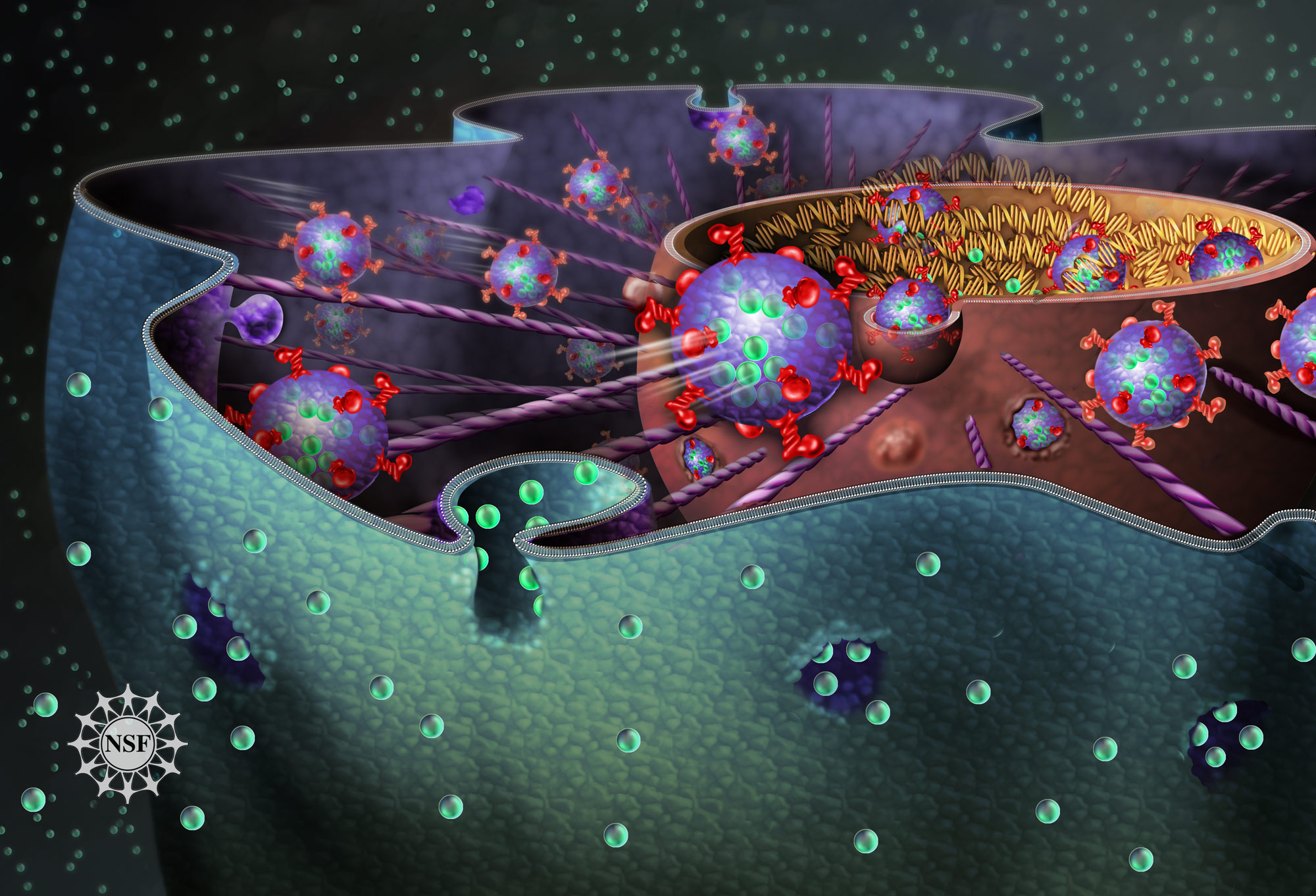
Invagination of the plasma membrane during endocytosis, forming an intracellular vesicle

Cytosis (as the biological suffix ‑cytosis) is used in words that describe either the quantity or condition of cells (e.g., leukocytosis, erythrocytosis) or processes that move material across cellular membranes. The three cellular transport processes are endocytosis (into the cell), exocytosis (out of the cell) and transcytosis (through the cell). Related endings include -osis (as in necrosis, apoptosis) and -esis (e.g., diapedesis, emperipolesis, cytokinesis).

== Etymology and pronunciation ==
The suffix -cytosis (/saɪˈtoʊsɪs/) uses combining forms of cyto- and -osis, reflecting a cellular process. The term was coined by Novikoff in 1961.

== Processes related to subcellular entry or exit ==
=== Endocytosis ===
Endocytosis is when a cell absorbs a molecule, such as a protein, from outside the cell by engulfing it with the cell membrane. It is used by most cells, because many critical substances are large polar molecules that cannot pass through the cell membrane. The two major types of endocytosis are pinocytosis and phagocytosis.

==== Pinocytosis ====
Pinocytosis, also known as cell drinking, is the absorption of small aqueous particles along with the membrane receptors that recognize them. It is an example of fluid phase endocytosis and is usually a continuous process within the cell. The particles are absorbed through the use of clathrin-coated pits. These clathrin-coated pits are short lived and serve only to form a vesicle for transfer of particles to the lysosome. The clathrin-coated pit invaginates into the cytosol and forms a clathrin-coated vesicle. The clathrin proteins will then dissociate. What is left is known as an early endosome. The early endosome merges with a late endosome. This is the vesicle that allows the particles that were endocytosed to be transported into the lysosome. Here there are hydrolytic enzymes that will degrade the contents of the late endosome. Sometimes, rather than being degraded, the receptors that were endocytosed along with the ligand are then returned to the plasma membrane to continue the process of endocytosis.

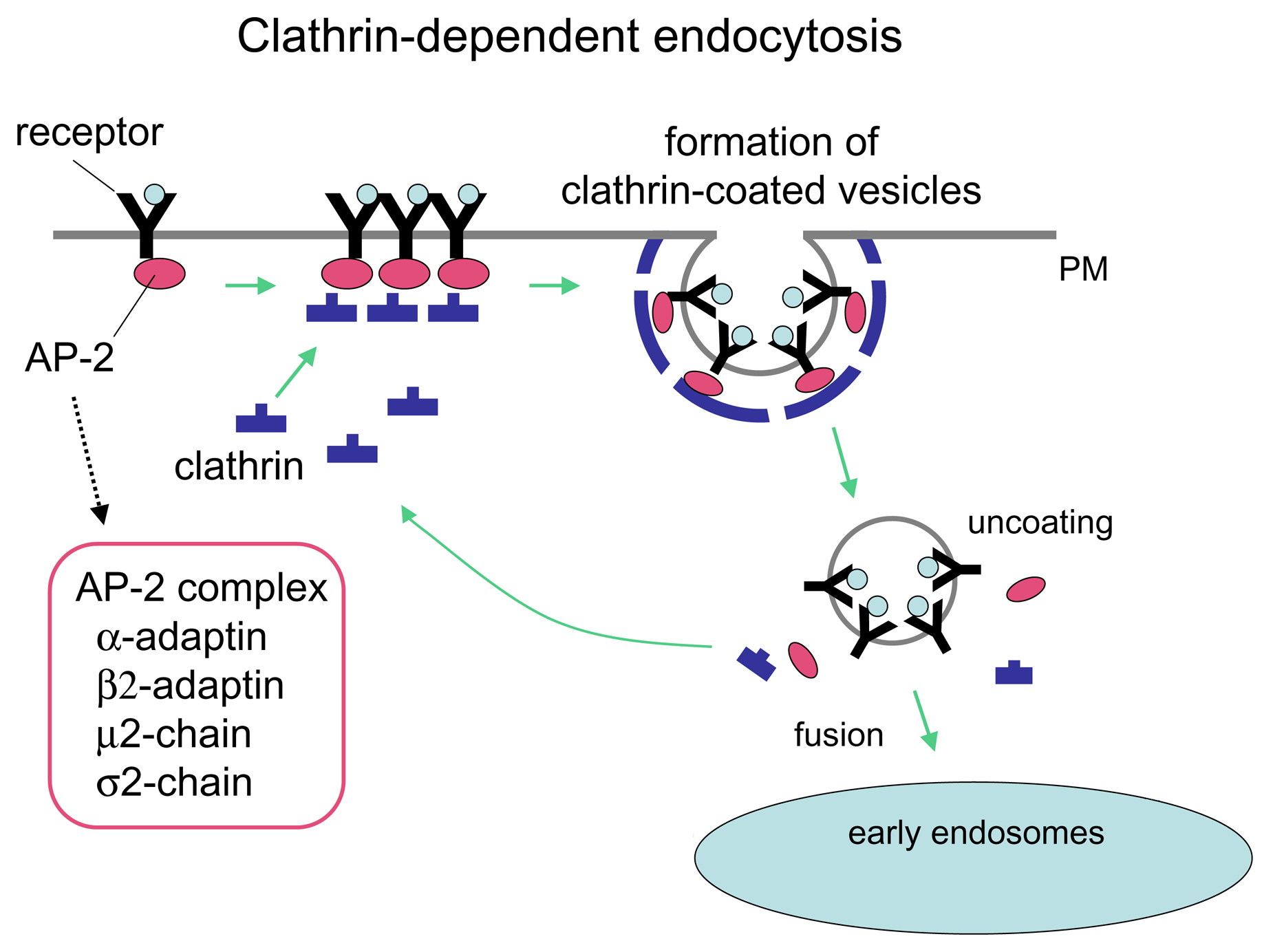
Mechanism of clathrin-dependent endocytosis. Clathrin-coated pits in endocytosis: The membrane of the cell invaginates using the protein clathrin. The clathrin uses actin to pull together the sides of the plasma membrane and form a vesicle inside the cellular cytosol.

Receptor-mediated endocytosis
Receptor-mediated endocytosis is a mode of pinocytosis. Proteins in the clathrin coat on the plasma membrane have propensity to bind and trap macromolecules or ligands. However, it is not the receptors in the pit that caused the pinocytosis. The vesicles would have formed regardless of whether or not the receptors and ligand were there. This is why it is still a continuous non-triggered event, unlike phagocytosis, which is explained below.

==== Phagocytosis ====
Phagocytosis, also known as cell eating, is the absorption of larger particles such as bacteria into the cytosol. In smaller single-celled organisms, this is how it feeds. In larger multicellular organisms, it is a way of destroying old or damaged cells or ingesting microbial invaders. In the case of ingesting a bacterium, the bacterium will be bound by antibodies in the aqueous environment. When this antibody runs into a receptor on the surface of a cell, the plasma membrane responds by extending itself to surround the bacterium. Thus, phagocytosis is not a randomly occurring event. It is triggered by a ligand binding to a receptor.

Some cells are specially designed to phagocytize. These cells include Natural Killer cells, macrophages, and neutrophils. All of these are involved in the immune response and serve to degrade foreign or antigenic material

=== Exocytosis ===
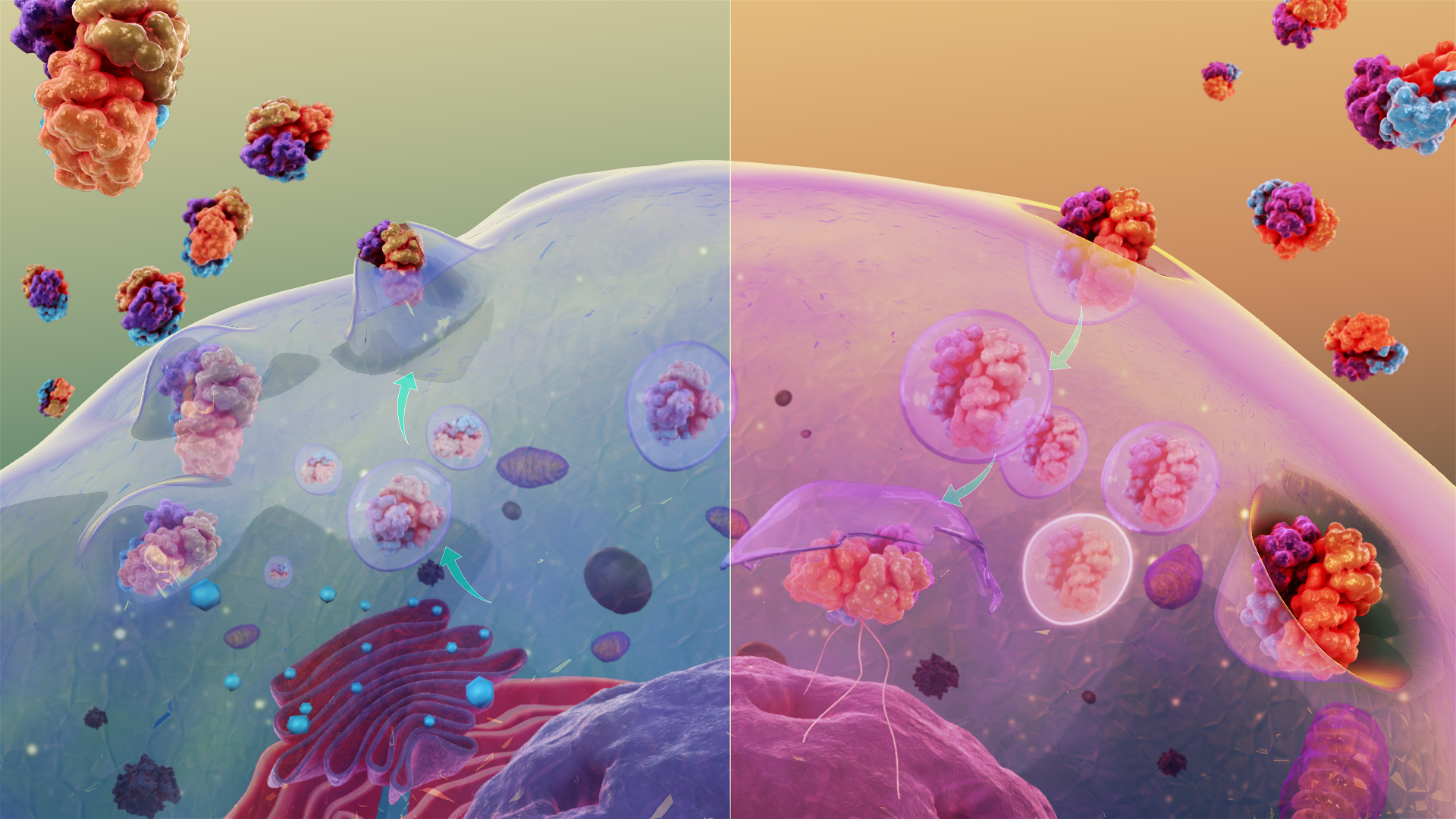
Exocytosis (L) and Endocytosis (R)

Exocytosis is when a cell directs the contents of secretory vesicles out of the cell membrane. The vesicles fuse with the cell membrane and their content, usually protein, is released out of the cell. There are two types of exocytosis: Constitutive secretion and Regulated secretion. In both of these types, a vesicle buds from the Golgi Apparatus and is shuttled to the plasma membrane, to be exocytosed from cell. Exocytosis of lysosomes commonly serves to repair damaged areas of the plasma membrane by replenishing the lipid bilayer.

Constitutive secretion (irregulated exocytosis)
This is when the vesicle that buds from the Golgi Apparatus contains both soluble proteins as well as lipids and proteins that will remain on the plasma membrane after fusion of the vesicle. This type of secretion is unregulated. The vesicle will eventually travel to the plasma membrane and fuse with it. The contents of the cell will be released into the extra-cellular space while the components of the vesicle membrane (plasma membrane lipids and proteins) will establish themselves as part of the cell's plasma membrane.

Regulated secretion (regulated exocytosis)
This is when the cell receives a signal from the extra-cellular space, such as a neurotransmitter or hormone, that regulates the fusing of the vesicle to the plasma membrane and the release of its contents. The vesicle is transported to the plasma membrane. There it sits until it receives a signal to fuse with the membrane and release its contents into the extra-cellular space.

=== Transcytosis ===
Transcytosis is a type of cytosis that allows particles to be shuttled from one membrane to another. An example of this would be when a receptor normally lies on the basal or lateral membrane of an epithelial cell, but needs to be trafficked to the apical side. This can only be done through transcytosis due to tight junctions, which prevent movement from one plasma membrane domain to another. This type of cytosis occurs commonly in epithelium, intestinal cells, and blood capillaries. Transcytosis can also be taken advantage of by pathogenic molecules and organisms. Several studies have shown that bacterium can easily enter intestinal lumen through transcytosis of goblet cells. Other studies, however, are exploring the idea that transcytosis may play a role in allowing medications to cross the blood-brain barrier. Exploiting this fact may allow certain drug therapies to be better utilized by the brain.

Methods of cytosis not only move substances in, out of, and through cells, but also add and subtract membrane from the cell's plasma membrane. The surface area of the membrane is determined by the balance of the two mechanisms and contributes to the homeostatic environment of the cell.

== Phenomenon related to cellular transformation or movements ==
=== Diapedesis ===
Movement of blood cells across endothelial layer

=== Emperipolesis ===
entering one cell into another

=== Trogocytosis ===
Double membrane endocytosis of one cells part by another

=== Efferocytosis ===
Phagocytosis of apoptotic cells.

=== Cytokinesis ===
Last part of cell division when two daughter cells separate

== Phenonomena related to cellular predominance ==
=== Leukocytosis ===
increase in number of leukocytes.

=== Thrombocytosis ===
increase in platelet or thrombocytes

=== Erythrocytosis ===
increase in RBC, usually a part of polycythemia where RBC total mass is increased.

== Phenomenon related to cellular morphology ==
=== Microcytosis ===
Small diameter or volume of cells eg RBC when classifying anemia which means microcytes dominating the blood picture.

=== Macrocytosis ===
Larger cells (macrocytes) dominating cellular population (RBCs).

=== Anisocytosis ===
Heterogeneity of size of cells.

=== Spherocytosis ===
Spherical cells (spherocytes) dominating cellular population (RBCs).

=== Ovalocytosis ===
Predominance of oval shaped cells.

=== Drepanocytosis ===
Sickled cells dominating blood picture.

== See also ==
- Clathrin
- Hydrolase
- Lysosome
- Phagocytosis
- Pinocytosis
