= Bulk endocytosis =

Bulk endocytosis refers to a form of endocytosis of synaptic vesicles at nerve terminals. In bulk endocytosis, compared to clathrin-mediated endocytosis, a larger area of presynaptic plasma membrane is internalised as cisternae or endosomes from which multiple synaptic vesicles can subsequently bud off. Bulk endocytosis is activated specifically during intense stimulation, such as during high-frequency trains of action potentials or in response to membrane depolarization by high extracellular concentrations of potassium.

== Mechanisms ==
The molecular mechanisms of bulk endocytosis have not been determined in detail. However some important signaling events have been described. For example, during high levels of neural activity, presynaptic intracellular calcium activates calcineurin which dephosphorylates dynamin. The F-BAR-protein syndapin interacts with dephosphorylated dynamin and is a crucial factor in anchoring dynamin at the plasma membrane. In line with the hypothesis that syndapin I induces bulk endocytosis, characterization of syndapin I knock-out mice revealed a crucial role of syndapin I in presynaptic membrane trafficking processes and accumulation of endocytic intermediates was especially evident under high-capacity retrieval conditions. Mechanistically, the F-BAR domain protein syndapin I possibly acts through further interactions with Arp2/3 and N-WASP. The GTPase dynamin then pinches off the large membrane-vacuole, which is either degraded or reused for synaptic vesicle production (possibly through clathrin coating). Clathrin-mediated endocytosis and bulk endocytosis appear to occur concurrently in highly active synaptic terminals. The dephosphorylation of dynamin does not prevent the association of amphiphysin, therefore allowing the two processes to happen independently of each other.

== See also ==
- BAR domain
- Endocytosis
- Phagocytosis
- Pinocytosis
- Syndapin
