= Virapinib =

Antiviral drug

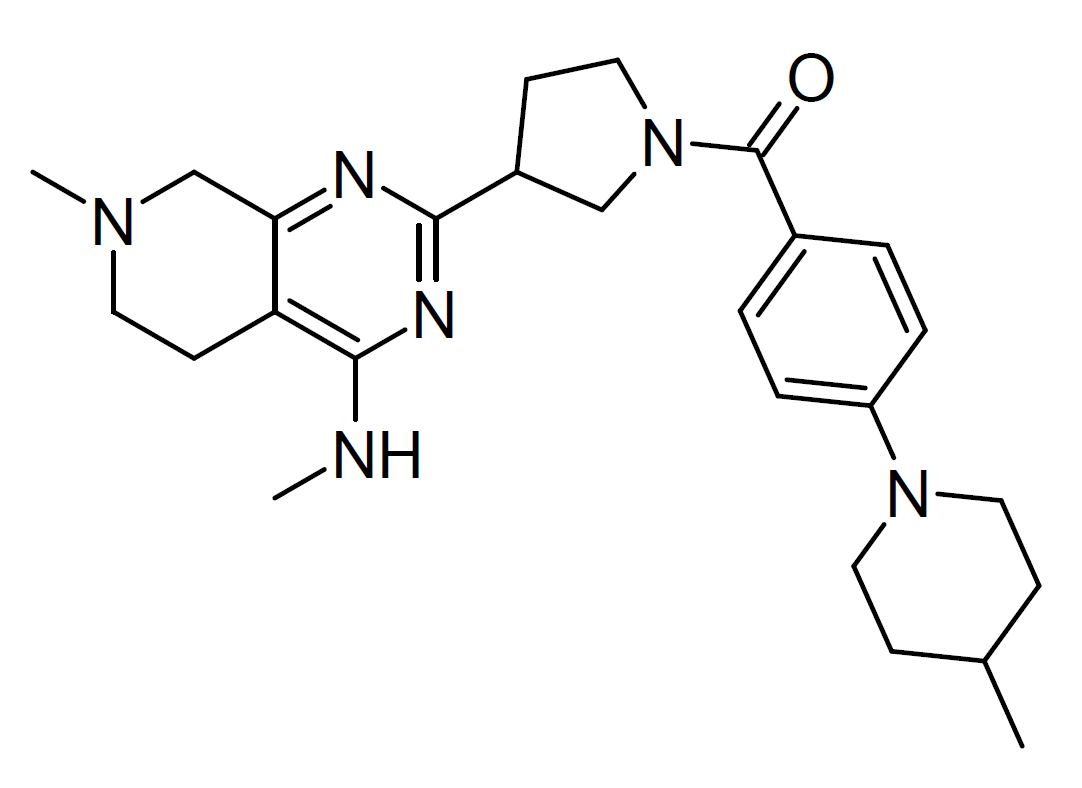

Identifiers
- IUPAC name: [3-[7-methyl-4-(methylamino)-6,8-dihydro-5H-pyrido[3,4-d]pyrimidin-2-yl]pyrrolidin-1-yl]-[4-(4-methylpiperidin-1-yl)phenyl]methanone
- CAS Number: 1794091-10-3
- PubChem CID: 127251916
- ChemSpider: 29964516

Chemical and physical data
- Formula: C_{26}H_{36}N_{6}O
- Molar mass: 448.615 g·mol^{−1}
- 3D model (JSmol): Interactive image
- SMILES: CC1CCN(CC1)C2=CC=C(C=C2)C(=O)N3CCC(C3)C4=NC5=C(CCN(C5)C)C(=N4)NC
- InChI: InChI=1S/C26H36N6O/c1-18-8-13-31(14-9-18)21-6-4-19(5-7-21)26(33)32-15-10-20(16-32)24-28-23-17-30(3)12-11-22(23)25(27-2)29-24/h4-7,18,20H,8-17H2,1-3H3,(H,27,28,29); Key:LUAVWTOZVHIDSI-UHFFFAOYSA-N

Virapinib is an antiviral drug which is the first drug developed that acts by inhibiting viral entry into cells via macropinocytosis. While it is only in early developmental stages, initial testing showed broad spectrum antiviral activity against a range of viruses including SARS-CoV-2, Monkeypox virus, Ebolavirus and tick-borne encephalitis virus.
