= Paul Fatt =

British neuroscientist

Paul Fatt FRS
- Born: 13 January 1924; Chicago, IL
- Died: 28 September 2014 (aged 90); London, UK
- Known for: Quantal theory of neurotransmitter release; T-tubules
- Spouses: Ione Copplestone; Gertrude Falk; Carla Wartenberg
- Children: Michael Fett; Laura Fett; Harriet Fett; Ilsa Fatt
- Scientific career
- Workplaces: University College London
- Thesis: Neuro-muscular transmission (1950)
- Doctoral advisor: Bernard Katz

Paul Fatt FRS (13 January 1924 – 28 September 2014) was a British neuroscientist, who was a professor at University College London. With Bernard Katz, he developed the "quantal hypothesis" for neurotransmitters.

== Early life and education ==
Paul Fatt was born in Chicago, IL, on 13 January 1924, in a Jewish-American family. His parents, Annie (née Arkin) and David were immigrants from eastern Slovakia (then Austro-Hungarian empire) and Lithuania (then Russian Empire), respectively. Paul had an elder brother Irving (1920–1996), a chemical engineer, and a younger brother Milton (1929–2011), a mathematician. Paul Fatt went to Grant’s Elementary School in Chicago. During those years, Paul spent his Saturdays exploring the Field Museum and other museums along the Lake Michigan waterfront. From those visits he acquired an interest in biology.

In 1938 the Fatt family moved from Chicago to Los Angeles, CA, where Paul attended Mount Vernon High School, then Fairfax High School, and then Los Angeles City College.

== Military service ==
When Japan attacked Pearl Harbor in December 1941, and the USA entered World War II, Paul Fatt enlisted in the Army as a reservist. After an initial military training in California, he was transferred to Lexington, KY, and assigned to 291st Field Artillery Battalion where he was trained in localization of the enemy artillery sources, using artillery sound ranging. In 1944, Fatt was promoted to the rank of T4 sergeant, and sent via Liverpool to France. Having landed in October 1944 on the Omaha Beach, Fatt and his troop were first stationed near Cherbourg and assigned to guarding military railway transports. Then, the battalion was moved eastward and, on January 1, 1945, entered the Western Front near Aachen where he and his troop survived an attack by Luftwaffe. From there, the troop moved further east, crossing the Rhine and then Elbe rivers. There they remained stationed until the war's end.

Fatt spent several months in Étretat , France, then a month in Shrivenham, England, where he tried to restart his studies, taking courses in mathematics. Eventually, in 1946, the American soldiers were transported back to the U.S. by a Navy aircraft carrier. Paul travelled back to Los Angeles to reconnect with his family.

== Career and research ==
After returning from Europe, Fatt enrolled in a course on biochemistry and biophysics at Berkeley, which a financial assistance from the G.I. Bill made possible. There, he collaborated with Vernon Brooks, who recommended him to A. V. Hill. Hill invited Fatt to his laboratory in London. Thus, in 1948, Paul joined the Hill's Biophysics Research Unit at University College London (UCL), still with the help from the G.I. Bill. Under the mentorship of Bernard Katz, first at the Marine Biological Association in Plymouth, then in London, Fatt studied depolarization of the neuromuscular junction (a.k.a. motor end plate) by acetylcholine in squid and crayfish. He was one of the pioneers in the use of glass microelectrodes for the neurophysiological research. Extending this research to vertebrate (Note: This research was done on frogs (Rana temporaria),, as well as lizards (Lacerta dugesii) and tortoises (Testudo graeca).) motor end plates, Fatt and Katz studied the miniature end plate potentials (MEPPs) and demonstrated their quantal and spontaneous nature. The quantal aspect meant that the amplitudes of the MEPPs were integer multiples of the minimum value. The spontaneous aspect was evident from the time course of those potentials, which turned out to be a Markov process. Fatt and Katz found evidence that MEPPs resulted from small amounts of acetylcholine released by the presynaptic cell.

Having completed his PhD thesis, Fatt moved on to study synaptic inhibition in crustacean motor end plates. He showed that inhibition relied on an increase in conductance of the muscle cell membrane. To follow this interest, in 1952, Fatt moved to Australia to join the lab of John Eccles at the John Curtin School in Canberra. Working on cat motoneurons, inhibitory interneurons and sensory neurons, Fatt discovered that synaptic inhibition in mammals, as in crustaceans, relied on increased membrane conductance to chloride ions (Cl^{−}). He described in detail the electrophysiological properties of the two classes of muscle afferents (i.e., Ia fibers and Ib fibers), as well as their synaptic targets. Also, in Canberra, Fatt developed new experimental techniques: a double-barrel microelectrode, and an improved, more stable micromanipulator, which made those discoveries possible.

In 1956, Paul Fatt returned to London and took up a position as reader in the Biophysics Department at UCL. There, he collaborated with Bernard Ginsborg, and further investigated the mechanisms of synaptic inhibition; particularly, the ions involved in it. The two discovered calcium-dependent action potentials in crayfish muscle cells. Subsequently, Fatt and Jacques Boistel confirmed that Cl^{−} current was responsible for inhibition of the crayfish muscle cells. Then, they discovered that GABA was the neurotransmitter responsible for that inhibition. In another line of research, Fatt and Gertrude Falk, described the electrical properties of the muscle cells. With a hypothesis of a system of internal membranes that was continuous with the sarcolemma, they explained an apparent discrepancy between membrane impedance values, measured vs. estimated from the observed cell size. The measured impedance was several times higher than expected. (Note: These experiments were done on frog sartorius muscles and crayfish limb muscles.) These observations, along with electron microscopic images obtained by Hugh Huxley and Sally Page, led to the discovery of T-tubules.

From 1964 to 1985, Fatt and Falk studied signal transduction in vertebrate photoreceptors. Fatt attempted to explain the signal amplification mechanism by which a single photon absorbed by rhodopsin could elicit a measurable electrical response in a retinal bipolar cell. Although those studies generated important hypotheses about the mechanisms of phototransduction, which informed the work done by others and resulted in later discovery of the role of G proteins and cGMP, Fatt's experimental results in that period were not as groundbreaking as his earlier research. In 1985 Fatt stopped his research, and—four years later—retired from UCL.

== Political views and activity ==
Fatt was an active member of the Labour Party since 1950s. Sometimes, after lunch, he would go from door to door, soliciting support for the party. He joined Pugwash and Campaign for Nuclear Disarmament, and participated in marches and rallies, giving emotional speeches to warn against the risk of nuclear war. In 1983, Fatt authored a memorandum, signed by several fellows, opposing Margaret Thatcher's election as an honorary fellow of the Royal Society. He left the Labour Party in 2003, protesting against the party's support for the invasion of Iraq.

== Personal life ==
While in Australia, Paul Fatt married Ione Copplestone (1926–2016). They had three children: Michael (b. 1954), Laura (b. 1955) and Harriet (b. 1957). The marriage did not last, however, and Fatt returned to England in 1956, while Ione stayed in Australia. Several years later, Paul married Gertrude Falk (1925–2008) whom he had met during a scientific conference in Seattle where they both presented their respective research results. Paul and Gertrude had a daughter Ilsa (b. 1963) who later became a jewellery designer. In 1965, Fatt obtained British citizenship. Following his separation from Gertrude, Fatt married freelance translator Carla Wartenberg (1934–2019) in 1985, and the couple remained together until his death. Paul died peacefully on 28 September 2014 at his home in Hampstead.

== Awards and honours ==
In 1969, Paul Fatt was elected to the Fellowship of the Royal Society.
