= Pinocytosis =

Mode of endocytosis to bring small particles into a cell

Pinocytosis

In cellular biology, pinocytosis, otherwise known as fluid endocytosis and bulk-phase pinocytosis, is a mode of endocytosis in which small molecules dissolved in extracellular fluid are brought into the cell through an invagination of the cell membrane, resulting in their containment within a small vesicle inside the cell. These pinocytotic vesicles then typically fuse with early endosomes to hydrolyze (break down) the particles.

Pinocytosis is variably subdivided into categories depending on the molecular mechanism and the fate of the internalized molecules.

== Function ==
In humans, this process occurs primarily for absorption of fat droplets. In endocytosis the cell plasma membrane extends and folds around desired extracellular material, forming a pouch that pinches off creating an internalized vesicle. The invaginated pinocytosis vesicles are much smaller than those generated by phagocytosis. The vesicles eventually fuse with the lysosome, whereupon the vesicle contents are digested. Pinocytosis involves a considerable investment of cellular energy in the form of ATP.

=== Pinocytosis and ATP ===
Pinocytosis is used primarily for clearing extracellular fluids (ECF) and as part of immune surveillance. In contrast to phagocytosis, it generates very small amounts of ATP from the wastes of alternative substances such as lipids (fat). Unlike receptor-mediated endocytosis, pinocytosis is nonspecific in the substances that it does transport: the cell takes in surrounding fluids, including all solutes present.

== Etymology and pronunciation ==
The word pinocytosis (/ˌpɪnəsaɪˈtoʊsɪs, ˌpaɪ-, -noʊ-, -sə-/) uses combining forms of pino- + cyto- + -osis, all Neo-Latin from Greek, reflecting píno, to drink, and cytosis. The term was proposed by W. H. Lewis in 1931.

== Non-specific, adsorptive pinocytosis ==
Non-specific, adsorptive pinocytosis is a form of endocytosis, a process in which small particles are taken in by a cell by splitting off small vesicles from the cell membrane. Cationic proteins bind to the negative cell surface and are taken up via the clathrin-mediated system, thus the uptake is intermediate between receptor-mediated endocytosis and non-specific, non-adsorptive pinocytosis. The clathrin-coated pits occupy about 2% of the surface area of the cell and only last about a minute, with an estimated 2500 leaving the average cell surface each minute. The clathrin coats are lost almost immediately, and the membrane is subsequently recycled to the cell surface.

== Macropinocytosis ==
Macropinocytosis is a clathrin-independent endocytic mechanism that can be activated in practically all animal cells, resulting in uptake. In most cell types, it does not occur continuously but rather is induced for a limited time in response to cell-surface receptor activation by specific cargoes, including growth factors, ligands of integrins, and apoptotic cell remnants. These ligands activate a complex signaling pathway, resulting in a change in actin dynamics and the formation of cell-surface protrusions of filopodia and lamellopodia, commonly called ruffles. When ruffles collapse back onto the membrane, large fluid-filled endocytic vesicles form called macropinosomes, which can transiently increase the bulk fluid uptake of a cell by up to tenfold. Macropinocytosis is a solely degradative pathway: macropinosomes acidify and then fuse with late endosomes or endolysosomes, without recycling their cargo back to the plasma membrane.

Some bacteria and viruses have evolved to induce macropinocytosis as a mechanism for entering host cells. Some of these can stop the degradation processes in order to survive inside the macropinosome, which may transform into smaller and long-lasting vacuoles containing the viruses or bacteria (some of which may replicate inside), or simply escape through the wall of the macropinosome when inside. For example, the gut pathogen Salmonella typhimurium injects toxins into the host cell in order to induce macropinocytosis as a form of uptake, inhibits the degradation of the macropinosome, and forms a salmonella-containing vacuole, or SCV, wherein it can replicate.

=== Inhibitors ===
- Virapinib

== See also ==
- Caveolae
- Phagocytosis
- Receptor-mediated endocytosis
