= Bernard Katz =

German-British biophysicist (1911–2003)

Sir Bernard Katz FRS
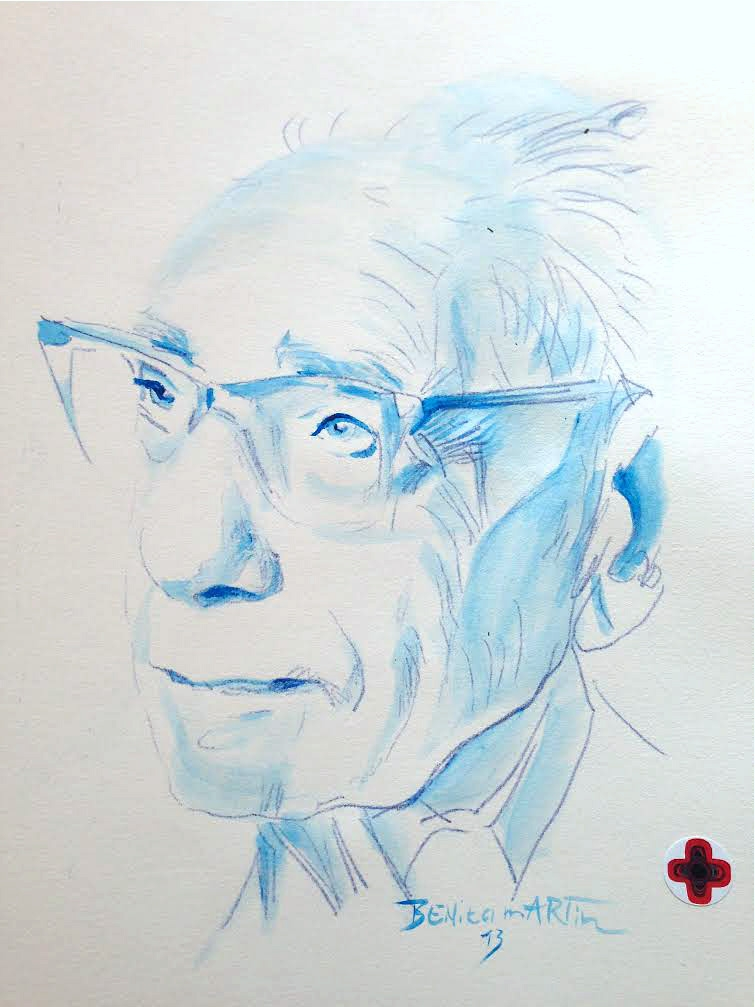
- Painting after a portrait by Nick Sinclair
- Born: 26 March 1911; Leipzig, German Empire
- Died: 20 April 2003 (aged 92); London, UK
- Education: University of Leipzig
- Known for: Goldman–Hodgkin–Katz flux equation Goldman–Hodgkin–Katz voltage equation Quantal neurotransmitter release
- Spouse: Marguerite ("Rita") Penly Katz (d. 1999)
- Children: 2 sons
- Awards: Royal Society Copley Medal (1967); Nobel Prize in Physiology or Medicine (1970); Ralph W. Gerard Prize in Neuroscience (1990)
- Scientific career
- Fields: Neurophysiology; Biophysics
- Workplaces: University College London; University of Sydney; Sydney Hospital
- Academic advisors: Archibald Vivian Hill

Sir Bernard Katz, FRS (German pronunciation: [ˈbɛʁnaʁt kat͡s]; 26 March 1911 – 20 April 2003) was a German-born British physician and biophysicist, noted for his work on nerve physiology; specifically, for his work on synaptic transmission at the nerve-muscle junction. He shared the Nobel Prize in physiology or medicine in 1970 with Julius Axelrod and Ulf von Euler. He was made a Knight Bachelor in 1969.

== Life and career ==
Katz was born in Leipzig, Germany, to a Jewish family originally from Russia, the son of Eugenie (Rabinowitz) and Max Katz, a fur merchant. He was educated at the Albert Gymnasium in that city from 1921 to 1929 and went on to study medicine at the University of Leipzig. He graduated in 1934 and fled to Britain in February 1935.

Katz went to work at University College London, initially under the tutelage of Archibald Vivian Hill. He finished his PhD in 1938 and won a Carnegie Fellowship to study with John Carew Eccles at the Kanematsu Institute of Sydney Medical School. During this time, both he and Eccles gave research lectures at the University of Sydney. He obtained British nationality in 1941 and joined the Royal Australian Air Force in 1942. He spent the war in the Pacific as a radar officer and in 1946 was invited back to UCL as an assistant director by Hill. For three years until 1949, the Katz family lived with Hill and his wife Margaret in the top flat of their house in Highgate.

Back in England he also worked with the 1963 Nobel Prize winners Alan Hodgkin and Andrew Huxley. Katz was made a professor at UCL in 1952 and head of the Biophysics Department; he was elected a Fellow of the Royal Society (FRS) in 1952. He stayed as head of Biophysics until 1978 when he became emeritus professor.

Katz married Marguerite Penly in 1945. He died in London on 20 April 2003, at the age of 92. His son Jonathan is Public Orator of the University of Oxford.

== Research ==
His research uncovered fundamental properties of synapses, the junctions across which nerve cells signal to each other and to other types of cells. By the 1950s, he was studying the biochemistry and action of acetylcholine, a signalling molecule found in synapses linking motor neurons to muscles, used to stimulate contraction. Katz won the Nobel Prize for his discovery with Paul Fatt that neurotransmitter release at synapses is "quantal", meaning that at any particular synapse, the amount of neurotransmitter released is never less than a certain amount, and if more is always an integral number times this amount. Scientists now understand that this circumstance arises because, prior to their release into the synaptic gap, transmitter molecules reside in like-sized subcellular packages known as synaptic vesicles, released in a similar way to any other vesicle during exocytosis.

Katz's work had immediate influence on the study of organophosphates and organochlorines, the basis of new post-war study for nerve agents and pesticides, as he determined that the complex enzyme cycle was easily disrupted.

== Collections ==
Katz's son Jonathan presented the personal archive of his father to University College London in 2003. The collection includes biographical documents, correspondence, notes on lectures, publications, and research material.

== See also ==
- Chemical synapse
- Quantal neurotransmitter release
- End-plate potential
- List of refugees
- Neuromuscular junction
- List of Jewish Nobel laureates
