= Receptor-mediated endocytosis =

Process by which cells absorb materials

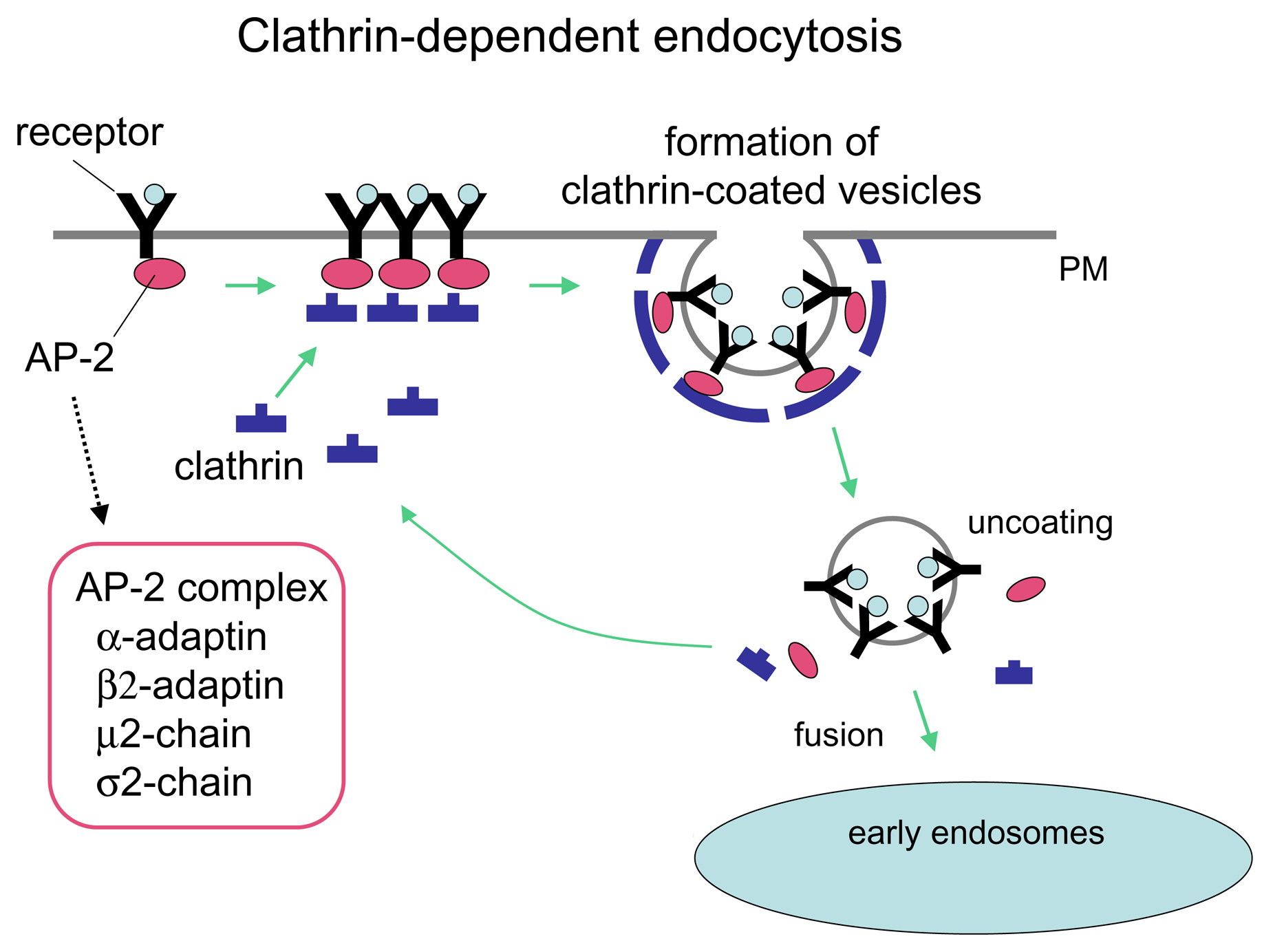
Mechanism of clathrin-dependent endocytosis

Receptor-mediated endocytosis (RME), also called clathrin-mediated endocytosis, is a process by which cells absorb metabolites, hormones, proteins – and in some cases viruses – by the inward budding of the plasma membrane (invagination). This process forms vesicles containing the absorbed substances and is strictly mediated by receptors on the surface of the cell. Only the receptor-specific substances can enter the cell through this process.

== Process ==
Although receptors and their ligands can be brought into the cell through a few mechanisms (e.g. caveolin and lipid raft), clathrin-mediated endocytosis remains the best studied. Clathrin-mediated endocytosis of many receptor types begins with the ligands binding to receptors on the cell plasma membrane. The ligand and receptor will then recruit adaptor proteins and clathrin triskelions to the plasma membrane around where invagination will take place. Invagination of the plasma membrane then occurs, forming a clathrin-coated pit. Other receptors can nucleate a clathrin-coated pit allowing formation around the receptor. A mature pit will be cleaved from the plasma membrane through the use of membrane-binding and fission proteins such as dynamin (as well as other BAR domain proteins), forming a clathrin-coated vesicle that then uncoats of clathrin and typically fuses to a sorting endosome. Once fused, the endocytosed cargo (receptor and/or ligand) can then be sorted to lysosomal, recycling, or other trafficking pathways.

== Function ==
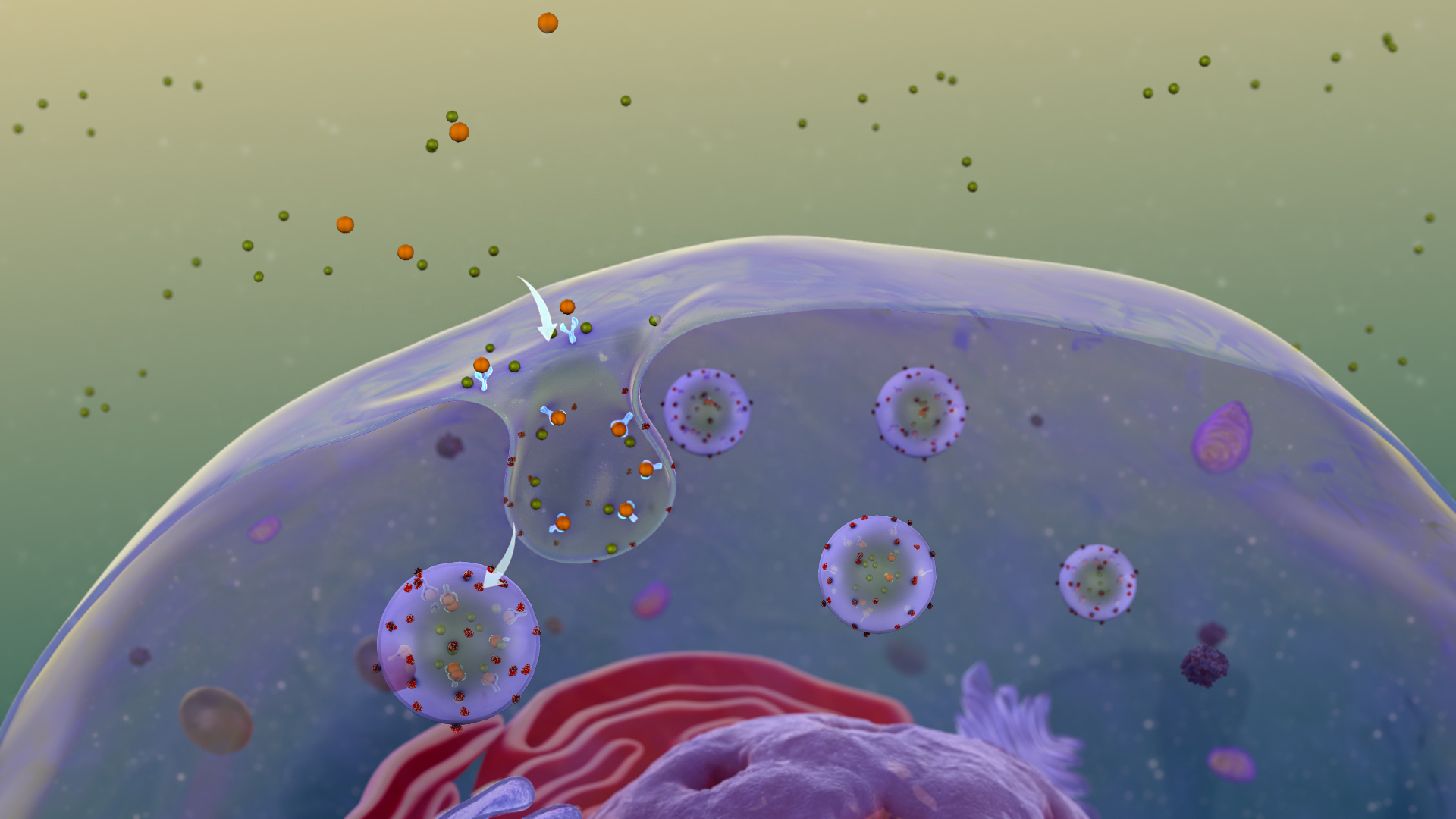
Endocytosis is triggered when a specific receptor is activated in receptor-mediated endocytosis.

The function of receptor-mediated endocytosis is diverse. It is widely used for the specific uptake of certain substances required by the cell (examples include LDL via the LDL receptor or iron via transferrin). The role of receptor-mediated endocytosis is well recognized to up take downregulation of transmembrane signal transduction but can also promote sustained signal transduction. The activated receptor becomes internalised and is transported to late endosomes and lysosomes for degradation. However, receptor-mediated endocytosis is also actively implicated in transducing signals from the cell periphery to the nucleus. This became apparent when it was found that the association and formation of specific signaling complexes via clathrin-mediated endocytosis is required for the effective signaling of hormones (e.g. EGF). Additionally it has been proposed that the directed transport of active signaling complexes to the nucleus might be required to enable signaling, due to the fact that random diffusion is too slow, and mechanisms permanently downregulating incoming signals are strong enough to shut down signaling completely without additional signal-transducing mechanisms.

== Experiments ==
Using fluorescent or EM visible dyes to tag specific molecules in living cells, it is possible to follow the internalization of cargo molecules and the evolution of a clathrin-coated pit by fluorescence microscopy and immuno electron microscopy.

Since the process is non-specific, the ligand can be a carrier for larger molecules. If the target cell has a known specific pinocytotic receptor, drugs can be attached and will be internalized.

To achieve internalisation of nanoparticles into cells, such as T cells, antibodies can be used to target the nanoparticles to specific receptors on the cell surface (such as CCR5). This is one method of improving drug delivery to immune cells.

The development of photoswitchable peptide inhibitors of protein-protein interactions involved in clathrin-mediated endocytosis (Traffic Lights peptides) and photoswitchable small molecule inhibitors of dynamin (Dynazos) has been reported. These photopharmacological compounds allow spatiotemporal control of the endocytosis with light.

== Characteristics ==
- Induction within minutes of exposure to excess ligand.
- The formation of these vesicles is sensitive to inhibition by wortmannin
- The initiation of vesicle formation can be delayed/inhibited by temperature variations

== See also ==
- Bulk endocytosis
- Endocytosis
- Non-specific, adsorptive pinocytosis
- Phagocytosis
- Pinocytosis
- Viropexis
