= Nobel Prize controversies =

Controversies around the Nobel Prize

Nobel Prize
- Awarded for: Outstanding contributions in physics, chemistry, literature, peace, and physiology or medicine. The Sveriges Riksbank Prize in Economic Sciences in Memory of Alfred Nobel, identified with the Nobel Prize, is awarded for outstanding contributions in Economics.
- Country: Sweden; Norway
- Presented by: Swedish Academy; Royal Swedish Academy of Sciences; Karolinska Institutet; Norwegian Nobel Committee
- First award: 1901; 125 years ago
- Website: https://www.nobelprize.org/

Since the first award in 1901, conferment of the Nobel Prize has engendered controversy and criticism. After his death in 1896, the will of Swedish industrialist Alfred Nobel established that an annual prize be awarded for service to humanity in the fields of physics, chemistry, physiology or medicine, literature, and peace. Similarly, the Sveriges Riksbank Prize in Economic Sciences in Memory of Alfred Nobel, first awarded in 1969, is awarded along with the Nobel Prizes. Nobel sought to reward "those who, during the preceding year, shall have conferred the greatest benefit on mankind". Awards committees have historically rewarded discoveries over inventions.

No Nobel Prize was established for mathematics and many other scientific and cultural fields. An early theory that envy or rivalry led Nobel to omit a prize to mathematician Gösta Mittag-Leffler was refuted because of timing inaccuracies. Another myth that states that Nobel's spouse had an affair with a mathematician (sometimes attributed as Mittag-Leffler) has been equally debunked: Nobel was never married. A more likely explanation is that Nobel did not consider mathematics as a practical discipline, and too theoretical to benefit humankind, as well as his personal lack of interest in the field and the fact that an award to mathematicians given by Oscar II already existed at the time. Both the Fields Medal and the Abel Prize have been described as the "Nobel Prize of mathematics".

The most notorious controversies have been over prizes for Literature, Peace, and Economics. Beyond disputes over which contributor's work was more worthy, critics most often discerned political bias and Eurocentrism in the result.

A major controversy-generating factor for the more recent scientific prizes (Physics, Chemistry, and Medicine) is the Nobel rule that each award can be shared by no more than two different research areas and no more than three different individuals each year. This rule was adequate in 1901, when most of the science research was performed by individual scientists working with their small group of assistants in relative isolation. In more recent times science research has increasingly become a matter of widespread international cooperation and exchange of ideas among different research groups, themselves composed of dozens or even hundreds of researchers. The three person limit has then led to glaring omissions of key participants in awarded research.

Multiple commentators have noted that the two area, three person limit, without prizes to organizations, is mentioned nowhere in Nobel's will. These limitations were added by the award committee, and could be easily changed. The Nobel Peace Prize, for example, is often granted to organizations. This would certainly have been appropriate for the physics discoveries made by huge research consortiums such as ATLAS/CMS (2013) or LIGO (2017).

== Chemistry ==
=== 1918: Haber ===
The 1918 Nobel Prize in Chemistry was awarded to Fritz Haber for his invention of the Haber–Bosch process, which allowed for the efficient synthesis of ammonia, leading to the economical mass production of chemical fertilizers. The award was controversial, as Haber had overseen Germany's chemical weapons program during World War I. The Nobel Prize committee considered his war activities but noted his ammonia synthesis process was "the greatest benefit to mankind".

=== 1922–1946 ===
From 1922 to 1946, the American scientist Gilbert N. Lewis, who was widely known for his coining of the covalent bond, electron pair, Lewis structure and other seminal contributions that have become near-universal conventions in chemistry, was nominated 41 times for the Nobel Prize in Chemistry but never won. It has been speculated that while working in Walther Nernst's lab, Lewis developed a lifelong enmity with Nernst. In the following years, Lewis started to criticize and denounce his former teacher on many occasions, calling Nernst's work on his heat theorem "a regrettable episode in the history of chemistry". A friend of Nernst's, Wilhelm Palmær, was a member of the Nobel Chemistry committee. There is evidence that he used the Nobel nominating and reporting procedures to block a Nobel Prize for Lewis in thermodynamics by nominating Lewis for the prize three times, and then using his position as a committee member to write negative reports.

=== 1935: Joliot-Curies ===
In 1935, Frédéric and Irène Joliot-Curie were awarded the Nobel Prize in Chemistry for the discovery of induced radioactivity. Afterwards, Ștefania Mărăcineanu who also worked with the Curie family, claimed priority over the discovery.

=== 2003: Agre and McKinnon ===
Peter Agre was awarded the 2003 prize "for the discovery of water channels". Agre published his study about aquaporin in 1988; Gheorghe Benga had shown the existence of a protein water channel in the red blood cell membrane in 1986. The omission of Benga from the 2003 prize has been called a mistake in the awarding of Nobel Prizes. Agre acknowledged the contribution of Benga and others to the field discovery of aquaporins in his Nobel Lecture: "Their [aquaporins] existence was suggested by a group of pioneers in the water transport field who preceded us by decades".

=== 2007: Ertl ===
Gerhard Ertl, who was the sole recipient of the 2007 Nobel Prize in Chemistry for his studies of the catalytic effects of metal surfaces, has expressed surprise and disappointment that Gábor Somorjai, a foundational pioneer in modern surface science and catalysis, did not share the prize. Somorjai and Ertl had previously shared the Wolf Prize for Chemistry in 1998. The Nobel Prize committee's decision to exclude Somorjai was criticized in the surface-science community.

=== 2008: Chalfie, Shinomura and Tsien ===
The 2008 prize was awarded to Osamu Shimomura, Martin Chalfie and Roger Y. Tsien for their work on green fluorescent protein (GFP). A fourth potential recipient, Douglas Prasher, was the first to clone the GFP gene and suggest its use as a biological tracer; however, he had left academia and was working as a courtesy shuttle bus driver - a fact which received considerable media coverage. Lack of support for Prasher's work, and failure to get tenure at the Woods Hole Oceanographic Institute in Massachusetts where he was employed, caused Prasher to leave this field of research in 1992, but not before he offered samples of the gene to any interested researchers, including Chalfie and Tsien. Tsien noted the prize is usually awarded for "specific discoveries" and that he had put forward Shimomura and Prasher to the Nobel Committee in 2004. Chalfie stated, "Douglas Prasher's work was critical and essential for the work we did in our lab. They could've easily given the prize to Douglas and the other two and left me out." Roger Tsien had offered Prasher a job when his academic career stalled. Eventually, Prasher accepted the offer and moved in 2013 to UCSD to join Tsien's lab.

=== 2019: Goodenough, Whittingham and Yoshino ===
When the 2019 prize was awarded, numerous scientific societies reacted to Rachid Yazami's omission for his co-invention of the lithium-ion battery with Stanley Whittingham who was recognized. Whittingham shared the prize with John Goodenough for their cathodes and Akira Yoshino for the first working prototype unlike the importance of the working graphite anode invented by Yazami. Due to the Nobel Prize's limitation of up to three recipients, Yazami believes the committee had to make a difficult decision between Whittingham and himself. He nevertheless congratulated the three recipients of the prize.

=== 2020: Doudna and Charpentier ===
The Lithuanian and Spanish scientific communities expressed disappointment when the committee did not include Virginijus Šikšnys or Francisco Mojica along with Emmanuelle Charpentier and Jennifer Doudna in the award as both of them made crucial contributions to the development of CRISPR gene editing technology.

=== Others ===
- While Henry Eyring (1901–1981) was allegedly denied the prize because of his membership in the Church of Jesus Christ of Latter-day Saints, it is also possible that the Royal Swedish Academy of Sciences did not understand Eyring's theory until it was too late to award him the prize; the academy awarded him the Berzelius Medal in 1977 as partial compensation.
- Dmitri Mendeleev, the original creator of the periodic table of the elements, never received a Nobel Prize. He completed his first periodic table in 1869. However, a year earlier, another chemist, Julius Lothar Meyer, had reported a somewhat similar table. In 1866, John Alexander Reina Newlands presented a paper that first proposed a periodic law. However, none of these tables were correct—the 19th-century tables arranged the elements in order of increasing atomic weight (or atomic mass). It was left to the English physicist Henry Moseley to base the periodic table on the atomic number (the number of protons). Mendeleev died in 1907, six years after the first Nobel Prizes were awarded. He came within one vote of winning in 1906, but died the next year. István Hargittai claimed that Mendeleev's omission was due to behind-the-scenes machinations of one dissenter on the Nobel Committee who disagreed with his work.
- There has been criticism of the Chemistry prize being granted to non-chemists, in fields that could more rightly be considered physics or medicine.

== Economics ==
Economics was not on Nobel's original list of prize disciplines. Sweden's central bank Sveriges Riksbank created the Sveriges Riksbank Prize in Economic Sciences in Memory of Alfred Nobel in 1969. Although it is governed by the same rules as the others, many, including members of the Nobel family, criticized this prize for violating Nobel's intent. As of 2025, the faculty of the University of Chicago had garnered 15 prizes followed by MIT with 10 and Harvard University with 9.

=== 1976: Friedman ===
The 1976 prize was awarded to Milton Friedman "for his achievements in the fields of consumption analysis, monetary history and theory and for his demonstration of the complexity of stabilisation policy". The award caused international protests because of Friedman's association with Chilean dictator Augusto Pinochet. During March 1975, Friedman visited Chile and gave lectures on inflation, meeting with Pinochet and other government officials.

=== 1994: Harsanyi, Nash and Selten ===
The 1994 prize to John Forbes Nash and others "for their pioneering analysis of equilibria in the theory of non-cooperative games" caused controversy within the selection committee because of Nash's mental illness and alleged antisemitism. The controversy resulted in a change to the governing committee: members served three-year instead of unlimited terms and the prize's scope expanded to include political science, psychology, and sociology.

== Literature ==
The Nobel Prize in Literature has a history of controversial omissions. Joseph Epstein noted: "You may not know it, but you and I are members of a club whose fellow members include Leo Tolstoy, Henry James, Anton Chekhov, Mark Twain, Henrik Ibsen, Marcel Proust, Joseph Conrad, James Joyce, Thomas Hardy, Jorge Luis Borges and Vladimir Nabokov. The club is the Non-Winners of the Nobel Prize in Literature. All these authentically great writers, still alive when the prize, initiated in 1901, was being awarded, didn't win it." This led him to speculate that "Criteria other than high art seem to be involved."

== Physiology or medicine ==
=== 1902: Ross ===
Ronald Ross was awarded basically for his discovery of the life cycle of malarial parasite (as the citation goes: "for his work on malaria, by which he has shown how it enters the organism"). In 1897, independent of Ross, Giovanni Battista Grassi, along with his Italian associates, had established the developmental stages of malaria parasites in anopheline mosquitoes; and they described the complete life cycles of P. falciparum, P. vivax and P. malariae the following year. The initial opinion of the Nobel Committee was that the prize should be shared between Ross and Grassi. Then Ross made a defamatory campaign accusing Grassi of deliberate fraud. The weight of favour ultimately fell on Ross, largely upon the influences of Robert Koch, the appointed "neutral arbitrator" in the committee; as reported, "Koch threw the full weight of his considerable authority in insisting that Grassi did not deserve the honor". The indelible irony was that Ross was definitely the first to show that malarial parasite was transmitted by the bite of infected mosquitoes, in his case the avian Plasmodium relictum. But Grassi's work was much more directly relevant to human health as he demonstrated that human malarial parasites were infected only by female Anopheles (Ross never identified the mosquito species, not being a zoologist; "grey mosquito with dappled wings" was all that he could offer). Grassi identified the species correctly, and in 1898 who first established the complete life cycle of P. falciparum, the first human malarial parasite for which the entire cycle was determined. By today's standard, they should have undoubtedly shared the Nobel.

=== 1906: Golgi and Ramón y Cajal ===
Camillo Golgi and Santiago Ramón y Cajal were jointly awarded "in recognition of their work on the structure of the nervous system". However, their interpretations of discoveries were directly in opposition. Much as Golgi made significant contributions to the techniques in the study of nervous system in terms of actual structure, he made a completely erroneous conclusion that nervous system is nothing but a single continuous network, the notion called reticular theory. On the other hand, Ramón y Cajal described nervous system as composed of interlinking nerve cells or neurons as suggested by a theory called the neuron doctrine. Golgi strongly advocated the reticular theory such that even his Nobel lecture was a direct attack on Cajal's work and the neuron doctrine, and even depicted a diagram of continuous network which he claimed was "an exact reproduction after life". Therefore, recognising a work on wrong conclusion is inappropriate. The controversy and rivalry between the two scientists lasted even after the award of the Nobel Prize. The award is even dubbed as creating the "storm center of histological controversy". Cajal even commented that: "What a cruel irony of fate of pair, like Siamese twins united by the shoulders, scientific adversaries of such contrasting character!" The neuron doctrine turned out to be a more correct description, and Golgi was proved wrong with the development of electron microscopy in the 1950s by which it was clearly demonstrated that neurons are individual cells in the nervous system, and that they are interconnected through gaps called synapses. Recent studies suggest that there are notable exceptions. Electrical synapses are more common in the central nervous system than previously thought. Thus, rather than functioning as individual units, in some parts of the brain large ensembles of neurons may be active simultaneously to process neural information.

=== 1923: Banting and Macleod ===
The 1923 prize was awarded to Frederick Banting and John Macleod "for the discovery of insulin". Banting clearly deserved the prize, but the choice of Macleod as co-winner was controversial. Banting felt that Charles Best was the proper corecipient, while Macleod had merely given them laboratory space at the University of Toronto while Macleod was away for the summer. On his return, though, Macleod pointed out some flaws in their experimental design and gave them advice about directions in which to work. Banting's original method of isolating insulin required performing surgery on living dogs, which was too labor-intensive to produce insulin on a large scale. Best then set about finding a biochemical extraction method, while James Collip, a chemistry professor on sabbatical from the University of Alberta, joined Macleod's team and worked in parallel with Best. The two of them succeeded within days of each other. When Banting agreed to receive the prize, he decided to give half of his prize money to Best. Macleod, in turn, split his half of the prize money with Collip.

=== 1926: Fibiger ===
In 1926, no prize was awarded because the works of the two nominees Johannes Andreas Grib Fibiger and Katsusaburo Yamagiwa were considered undeserving. Fibiger had demonstrated that he could induce stomach cancer in rats using a roundworm Gongylonema neoplasticum that he discovered (but which he preferred to call Spiroptera carcinoma). Yamagiwa followed suit and induced cancer in rabbit by applying coal tar on the rabbit's ears. Theirs were the first experimental induction of cancer. One of the assessors Hilding Bergstrand concluded that "one cannot, at this point, find much support for the possibility that the work of Fibiger and Yamagiwa will have great importance in the solving of the riddle of cancer. Under such circumstances I do not consider these discoveries worthy of the Nobel Prize." In 1927, Fibiger was again nominated alongside Otto Heinrich Warburg and Julius Wagner-Jauregg; but Yamagiwa was excluded. The Nobel Committee decided to award the 1926 prize jointly to Fibiger and Warburg, and the 1927 prize to Wagner-Jauregg. But at the final selection, Karolinska Institute rejected Warburg. The 1926 prize went solely to Fibiger "for his discovery of the Spiroptera carcinoma". Fibiger's "finding" was discredited by other scientists shortly thereafter. Particularly after the last major experiment in 1952, it was established that the roundworm is not carcinogenic, and that cancers developed in Fibiger's experiments were due to vitamin A deficiency. Yamagiwa's exclusion was also criticised, because his experiment was a valid finding. Coal tar (and substances containing polycyclic aromatic hydrocarbons, or PAHs) are now known to be true carcinogens. Yamagiwa's work has become the primary basis for this line of research. Encyclopædia Britannica's guide to Nobel Prizes in cancer research mentions Yamagiwa's work as a milestone without mentioning Fibiger.

=== 1935: Spemann ===
The 1935 prize was awarded to Hans Spemann "for his discovery of the organizer effect in embryonic development". In 1991 Howard M. Lenhoff, then Professor of Developmental and Cell Biology at the University of California, published a paper pointing out that Ethel Browne Harvey should have shared in Spemann's Nobel Prize, because, as a graduate student, she had made a similar discovery many years earlier and understood its significance. Her work, done in 1909, preceded the experiments in 1924 by Spemann and Hilde Mangold that are credited with discovering the "organizer" — the work that was the basis of the Nobel Prize. Lenhoff noted there is evidence that Spemann knew about Ethel Browne Harvey's work, as she had sent a copy of her paper to Spemann, and in his copy the portion that discussed the significance of her work had been underlined.

=== 1952: Waksman ===
The 1952 prize was awarded to Selman Waksman "for his discovery of streptomycin, the first antibiotic effective against tuberculosis". Albert Schatz, who was a graduate student working under Waksman's direction at the time of discovery in 1943, petitioned the Nobel committee saying he had done all the work in isolating the antibiotic properties of Streptomyces griseus. Schatz, who two years earlier had successfully sued Waksman and Rutgers University for his share in the discovery, patent, and resulting royalties, was turned down by the Nobel committee. It was a reflection of the times when department heads were normally awarded the prize and has been looked on as a considerable mistake.

=== 1993: Roberts and Sharp ===
The 1993 prize went to Phillip Allen Sharp and Richard J. Roberts "for their discoveries of split genes", the discovery of introns in eukaryotic DNA, and the mechanism of gene splicing. Several other scientists, such as Norman Davidson and James Watson, argued that Louise T. Chow, a China-born Taiwanese researcher who collaborated with Roberts, should have had part of the prize. In 1976, as a scientist with her own grants, Chow carried out the studies of the genomic origins and structures of adenovirus transcripts that led directly to the discovery of RNA splicing and alternative RNA processing at Cold Spring Harbor Laboratory on Long Island in 1977. Norman Davidson, a Caltech expert in electron microscopy under whom Chow studied as a PhD student, affirmed that Chow was the crucial experiment's sole designer, using electron microscopy techniques she had developed, and that "only she could have interpreted those data". Chow's analysis of the complex gene patterns refuted Roberts' original hypothesis and deciphered the split genes. On Sharp's side, credit was excluded for Susan Berget, who at the time was a postdoctoral fellow who conducted the experiments and contributed analyses leading to the discovery.

=== 1997: Prusiner ===
The 1997 prize was awarded to Dr. Stanley B. Prusiner for his discovery of prions. This award caused a long stream of polemics. Critics attacked the validity of the work and questioned whether prions exist at all. The existence of prions was not fully accepted by the scientific community for at least a decade after the awarding of the prize.

=== 1998: Furchgott, Ignarro and Murad ===
The Nobel Prize for Physiology or Medicine was awarded in 1998 to Robert Furchgott, Louis Ignarro and Ferid Murad "for their discoveries concerning nitric oxide as a signalling molecule in the cardiovascular system". There followed protest by the scientific community due to the omission of Salvador Moncada, who was internationally recognized as the major contributor to the discovery of this field together with Robert Furchgott.

=== 2003: Lauterbur and Mansfield ===
The 2003 prize was awarded to Paul Lauterbur and Sir Peter Mansfield "for their discoveries concerning magnetic resonance imaging" (MRI). Two independent alternatives have been alleged, each of whom pioneered an important component of what became MRI imaging. Raymond Damadian showed magnetic differences between tissues could be medically significant, and made crude images. However these images were not medically useful due to impractically low speed and resolution. Herman Y. Carr pioneered the use of gradients in imaging, but only in one dimension and not on medical samples. Practical medical imaging uses a combination of these techniques, and more.

Damadian first reported that nuclear magnetic resonance (NMR) could distinguish in vitro between cancerous and non-cancerous tissues on the basis of different proton relaxation times. He later translated this into the first human scan, though it was very slow (5 hours) and low resolution (106 pixels). Damadian's original report motivated Lauterbur to develop NMR into the present method. Damadian took out large advertisements in an international newspapers protesting his exclusion. There has been speculation that Damadian was disfavored by the Nobel committee because he was an outspoken supporter of creationism. Overall, some believe that Damadian's work deserved at least a portion of the prize.

Carr both pioneered the NMR gradient technique and demonstrated rudimentary (one dimensional) MRI imaging in the 1950s. The Nobel prize winners had almost certainly seen Carr's work, but did not cite it. Consequently, the prize committee very likely was unaware of Carr's discoveries, a situation likely abetted by Damadian's campaign.

Mansfield himself said in his autobiography that "the person who really missed out" the prize was Erwin Hahn for his contribution to the principles of spin echoes.

=== 2006: Fire and Mello ===
The 2006 prize went to Andrew Fire and Craig C. Mello "for their discovery of RNA interference—gene silencing by double-stranded RNA". Many of the discoveries credited by the committee to Fire and Mello, who studied RNA interference in Caenorhabditis elegans, had been previously studied by plant biologists, and it was suggested that at least one plant biologist, such as David Baulcombe, should have been awarded a share of the prize.

=== 2008: Barré-Sinoussi, Hausen and Montaigner ===
The 2008 prize was awarded in part to Harald zur Hausen "for his discovery of human papilloma viruses (HPV) causing cervical cancer". The Swedish police anticorruption unit investigated charges of improper influence by AstraZeneca, which had a stake in two lucrative HPV vaccines. The company had agreed to sponsor Nobel Media and Nobel Web and had strong links with two senior figures in the process that chose zur Hausen. The other half of the 2008 prize was split between Luc Montagnier and Françoise Barré-Sinoussi "for their discovery of human immunodeficiency virus" (HIV). The omission of Robert Gallo was controversial: 106 scientists signed a letter to the journal Science stating that "While these awardees fully deserve the award, it is equally important to recognize the contributions of Robert C. Gallo", which "warrant equal recognition". Montagnier said that he was "surprised" that the award had not been shared with Gallo.

=== 2009: Blackburn, Greider and Szostak ===
When the 2009 Nobel Prize in Physiology or Medicine was awarded to Elizabeth Blackburn, Carol Greider and Jack Szostak for their work in cell-aging and telomeres it was pointed out in Russian media that Alexey Olovnikov should have been co-awarded the Prize for his work in the same field in 1971. Olovnikov recognized the problem of telomere shortening, predicted the existence of telomerase, and suggested the telomere hypothesis of aging and the relationship of telomeres to cancer.

=== 2010: Edwards ===
The decision to award the 2010 Nobel Prize for Physiology or Medicine to Robert Edwards for developing the technique of in vitro fertilisation was bitterly denounced by the Catholic Church, which objects to all artificial methods of human conception and fertilization as well as to contraception. One Vatican official called the award "out of order", and the International Federation of Catholic Medical Associations issued a statement saying that the use of human embryos, created and discarded "as experimental animals destined for destruction, has led to a culture where they are regarded as commodities rather than the precious individuals which they are".

=== 2011: Beutler, Hoffman and Steinman ===
The 2011 prize was awarded in part to Ralph Steinman, who had died of cancer days before the award, a fact unknown to the Nobel committee at the time. Committee rules prohibit posthumous awards, and Steinman's death created a dilemma unprecedented in the history of the award. The committee ruled that Steinman remained eligible for the award despite his death, under the rule that allows awardees to receive the award who die between being named and the awards ceremony.

=== Others ===
- Oswald Theodore Avery, best known for his 1944 demonstration that DNA is the cause of bacterial transformation and potentially the material of which genes are composed, never received a Nobel Prize, although two Nobel laureates, Joshua Lederberg and Arne Tiselius, praised him and his work as a pioneering platform for further genetic research. According to John M. Barry, in his book The Great Influenza, the committee was preparing to award Avery (for his work in immunology), but declined to do so after his DNA findings were published, fearing that they would be endorsing findings that had not yet survived significant scrutiny.
- Carlos Chagas' 1909 discovery of the tropical parasitic disease which bears his name, Chagas disease, has been looked on by some historical researchers as worthy of a Nobel prize (he received one nomination in 1913 and again in 1921), but may have been denied it because of misunderstandings and infighting between him and his colleagues and government officials.
- The Nobel Committee does not rescind prizes, even when their validity is eventually disproven. For example, António Egas Moniz received the prize in 1949 for the prefrontal lobotomy which was bestowed despite protests from the medical establishment.

== Laureates who declined the prize ==
=== Forced refusals ===
==== Forced refusals under Nazi Germany ====
In 1936, the Nobel Foundation offended Adolf Hitler when it awarded the 1935 Nobel Peace Prize to Carl von Ossietzky, a German writer who publicly opposed Hitler and Nazism. (The prize was awarded the following year.) Hitler reacted by issuing a decree on 31 January 1937 that forbade German nationals from accepting any Nobel Prize. Awarding the peace prize to Ossietzky was itself considered controversial. While fascism had few supporters outside Italy, Spain, and Germany, those who did not necessarily sympathize felt that it was wrong to (deliberately) offend Germany. Hitler's decree prevented three Germans from accepting their prizes: Gerhard Domagk (1939 Nobel Prize in Physiology or Medicine), Richard Kuhn (1938 Nobel Prize in Chemistry), and Adolf Butenandt (1939 Nobel Prize in Chemistry). The three later received their certificates and medals, but not the prize money.

On 19 October 1939, about a month and a half after World War II had started, the Nobel Committee of the Karolinska Institutet met to discuss the 1939 prize in physiology or medicine. The majority favoured Domagk and someone leaked the news, which traveled to Berlin. The Ministry of Culture in Berlin replied with a telegram stating that a Nobel Prize to a German was "completely unwanted" (durchaus unerwünscht). Despite the telegram, a large majority voted for Domagk on 26 October 1939. Once he learned of the decision, hopeful that it only applied to the peace prize, Domagk sent a request to the Ministry of Education in Berlin asking permission to accept the prize. Since he did not receive a reply after more than a week had passed, Domagk felt it would be impolite to wait any longer without responding, and on 3 November 1939 he wrote a letter to the institute thanking them for the distinction, but added that he had to wait for the government's approval before he could accept the prize.

Domagk was subsequently ordered to send a copy of his letter to the Ministry for Foreign Affairs in Berlin, and on 17 November 1939, was arrested by the Gestapo. He was released after one week, then arrested again. On 28 November 1939, he was forced by the Ministry of Culture to sign a prepared letter, addressed to the institute, declining the prize. Since the institute had already prepared his medal and diploma before the second letter arrived, they were able to award them to him later, during the 1947 Nobel festival. Domagk was the first to decline a prize. Due to his refusal, the procedures changed so that if a laureate declined the prize or failed to collect the prize award before 1 October of the following year, the money would not be awarded.

On 9 November 1939, the Swedish Royal Academy of Sciences awarded the 1938 Prize for Chemistry to Kuhn and half of the 1939 prize to Butenandt. When notified of the decision, the German scientists were forced to decline by threats of violence. Their refusal letters arrived in Stockholm after Domagk's refusal letter, helping to confirm suspicions that the German government had forced them to refuse the prize. In 1948, they wrote to the academy expressing their gratitude for the prizes and their regret for being forced to refuse them in 1939. They were awarded their medals and diplomas at a ceremony in July 1949.

==== Other forced refusals ====
Boris Pasternak at first accepted the 1958 Nobel Prize in Literature, but was forced by Soviet authorities to decline, because the prize was considered a "reward for the dissident political innuendo in his novel, Doctor Zhivago." Pasternak died without ever receiving the prize. He was eventually honoured by the Nobel Foundation at a banquet in Stockholm on 9 December 1989, when they presented his medal to his son. The 2010 Nobel Peace Prize was awarded to Liu Xiaobo while he was serving a prison sentence for "subversion of the state", with the Chinese government not allowing him or his family members to attend the ceremony.

=== Voluntary refusals ===
Two laureates have voluntarily declined the Nobel Prize. Jean-Paul Sartre declined the 1964 prize for Literature, stating, "A writer must refuse to allow himself to be transformed into an institution, even if it takes place in the most honourable form." The second person who refused the prize is Lê Đức Thọ, who was awarded the 1973 Peace Prize for his role in the Paris Peace Accords, which sought to end the Vietnam War. He declined, saying there was no actual peace in Vietnam. The war resumed four months after he was declared the winner.

== Mistakes in the award notification ==
Chemistry, 1987: The Nobel Committee mistakenly phoned Southern California carpet cleaner Donald O. Cram, trying to award him the Nobel Prize in Chemistry. They meant to call the Southern California chemist Donald J. Cram.

== Nobel rumors ==
1915 saw a newspaper rumor, starting with a 6 November Reuters report from London, along the lines that the Nobel Prize in Physics was to be awarded to both Thomas Edison and Nikola Tesla. The story had gone to press in many publications before a 15 November Reuters story from Stockholm with the announcement that the prize that year was being awarded to William Henry Bragg and his son William Lawrence Bragg "for their services in the analysis of crystal structure by means of X-rays". There were unsubstantiated rumors at the time that Tesla and Edison had won the prize and that the Nobel committee had changed recipients when Tesla and/or Edison refused the award (a claim also made many years later attributed to Tesla). The Nobel Foundation declined to comment on the rumors other than saying, "Any rumor that a person has not been given a Nobel Prize because he has made known his intention to refuse the reward is ridiculous", further stating a recipient could only decline a Nobel Prize after he is announced a winner. Otto Heinrich Warburg, a German national who won the 1931 Nobel Prize in Physiology and Medicine, was rumored to have been selected for the 1944 prize but forbidden to accept it. According to the Nobel Foundation, this story is not true.

== Other prizes ==
=== Prizes in non-Nobel domains ===
Multiple primary fields of human intellectual endeavor—such as mathematics, philosophy and social studies—were not included among the Nobel Prizes, because they were not part of Alfred Nobel's will. When Jakob von Uexkull approached the Nobel Foundation with a proposal to establish two new awards for the environment and for the lives of the poor, he was turned down. He then established the Right Livelihood Award. In 2003 purportedly a new Nobel-equivalent Award was also created especially for mathematics, the Abel Prize, though the older Fields Medal is often considered as the mathematical Nobel equivalent.

The Nobel Committee allowed the creation of the Nobel Memorial Prize in Economics. Many people have opposed this expansion, including the Swedish human rights lawyer Peter Nobel, a great-grandnephew of Alfred Nobel. In his speech at the 1974 Nobel banquet, awardee Friedrich Hayek stated that had he been consulted whether to establish an economics prize, he would "have decidedly advised against it" primarily because "the Nobel Prize confers on an individual an authority which in economics no man ought to possess... This does not matter in the natural sciences. Here the influence exercised by an individual is chiefly an influence on his fellow experts; and they will soon cut him down to size if he exceeds his competence. But the influence of the economist that mainly matters is an influence over laymen: politicians, journalists, civil servants and the public generally."

The Kluge Prize, a $1 million prize given by the John W. Kluge Center at the Library of Congress, is awarded for lifetime achievement in fields of humanistic and social science studies that are not included in the Nobel Prizes, most notably history, philosophy, politics, psychology, anthropology, sociology, religious studies, linguistics, and criticism in the arts and humanities. The Shaw Prize is awarded for achievements in the fields of astronomy and mathematical sciences besides life science and medicine. The Tang Prize categories include areas of sustainable development and rule of law which are not included in Nobel Prize, and also include biopharmaceutical science and sinology. The panels of judges are convened by Academia Sinica, located in Taiwan.

=== Alternatives to the Nobel Prizes ===
Following the announcement of the award of the 2010 Nobel Peace Prize to incarcerated Chinese dissident Liu Xiaobo, the Chinese tabloid Global Times created the Confucius Peace Prize. The award ceremony was deliberately organized to take place on 8 December, one day before the Nobel ceremony. Organizers said that the prize had no relation to the Chinese government, the Ministry of Culture or Beijing Normal University. The German National Prize for Art and Science was Hitler's alternative to the Nobel Prize. The Ig Nobel Prize is an American parody of the Nobel Prize.

== See also ==
- Nobel disease

== Bibliography ==
- Bishop, J. Michael (2003). How to Win the Nobel Prize: An Unexpected Life in Science. Cambridge, Massachusetts: Harvard University Press. ISBN 0-674-00880-4..
- Hager, Thomas (2006). The Demon under the Microscope: from battlefield hospitals to Nazi labs, one doctor's heroic search for the world's first miracle drug. New York: Harmony Books. ISBN 1-4000-8213-7..
- Nasar, Sylvia (1998). A Beautiful Mind. New York: Simon & Schuster. ISBN 0-684-81906-6..
- Ryan, Frank (1993). The Forgotten Plague: How the Battle Against Tuberculosis Was Won – and Lost. Boston, Massachusetts: Little, Brown and Company. ISBN 0-316-76380-2.. First published in the United Kingdom as Tuberculosis: The Greatest Story Never Told.
- Schück, Henrik; Sohlman, Ragnar; Österling, Anders; Liljestrand, Göran (1950). Nobel: The Man and His Prizes. Stockholm, Sweden: Nobel Foundation..
- Schück, Henrik; Sohlman, Ragnar; Österling, Anders; Bernhard, Carl Gustaf (1972). Nobel Foundation; Odelberg, W. (eds.). Nobel: The Man and His Prizes (3rd ed.). New York: American Elsevier Publishing Company, Inc. ISBN 0-444-00117-4..
