= Endothelium-derived relaxing factor =

Nitric Oxide as an EDRF

Nitric Oxide (NO), the principal EDRF

The Endothelium-derived relaxing factor (EDRF) is a strong vasodilator produced by cardiac endothelial cells in response to stress signals such as high levels of ADP accumulation or hypoxia. Robert F. Furchgott is widely recognised for this discovery, even going so far as to be a co-recipient of the 1998 Nobel Prize in Medicine with his colleagues Louis J. Ignarro and Ferid Murad. Nitric oxide (NO) is a key component in any EDRF as these compounds either include NO or are structurally in the form of NO.

== Physiological Functions and production ==
Anatomical cross section of an artery: the "intima" is composed of endothelial cells

EDRF serves various functions, of which the most common and topical are vasodilation and the prevention of platelet adhesion. EDRF also plays a role in the production of cyclic GMP.

EDRF is produced from L-arginine by an enzyme (endothelial nitric oxide synthase) that is dependent on calcium-calmodulin and NADPH - this occurs in the cardiac endothelium.

EDRF then diffuses to the smooth muscle in vascular tissue (vessels may be large or small), here it enacts endogenous vasodilation. Moreover, it serves the function of preventing sympathetic vasoconstriction - when the sympathetic nervous system, reacting to a situation perceived as dangerous, attempts to raise blood pressure through vasoconstriction.

The NO compound is also capable of reducing clotting in the blood stream due to its ability to prevent platelet adhesion and aggregation.

== Related pathology ==
Atherosclerosis and hypertension are grave contributors in the group of pathological conditions under the umbrella of Cardiovascular disease. Among these conditions is also the disfunction of the endothelium, which given its properties of vasodilation when functional, can cause excessive vasoconstriction, thus leading back to hypertension. Another effect of this particular disfunction may also be excessive platelet adhesion, signifying a significant increase in blood clots, thus the promotion of a prothrombotic state.
