= Susan Berget =

American biochemist

Susan M. Berget is a biochemist and professor emerita at the Baylor College of Medicine. Originally involved in the MIT lab of Phillip Sharp for her postdoctoral fellowship, she was instrumental in the research that led to the discovery of RNA splicing and split genes, which awarded Sharp the 1993 Nobel Prize in Physiology or Medicine. Berget was excluded, however, from receiving credit, which inhibited her attempts to apply for a professorship afterwards, particularly due to Sharp's letter of recommendation also not giving her credit for the research in his lab. Eventually, Nancy Hopkins and David Botstein convinced Sharp to rewrite his letter, allowing Berget to receive a professor invitation from Rice University.

She went on to become a professor at the Baylor College of Medicine, where her research focused on further understanding exons, introns, and the overall mechanisms of RNA splicing. Her research has been highly influential in figuring out the exon definition and recognition system of cells, along with the biochemical factors that help determine how splice sites are determined.

== Career ==
Berget obtained her Ph.D. from the University of Minnesota, before applying for a postdoctoral fellowship in Phillip Sharp's lab at MIT in 1975. She was tasked with comparing the genomes of human cells with adenovirus to determine the amount of viral genes in the human genome. This work led to Sharp winning the 1993 Nobel Prize in Physiology or Medicine. Due to the Nobel Committee's long-term rule on only allowing three winners for a Nobel Prize and Richard J. Roberts's lab also having to share the prize, Berget and Roberts' collaborator Louise Chow were excluded from the award. Berget stated that she had "made peace" with Sharp and is done with talking about "old issues", but admitted that if she could do that part of her life over again, she would have been a "lot more aggressive" in pushing for credit on her postdoctoral work.

However, in the fall of 1977 after publication and convention presentations of their work, while Berget was applying for job positions as a professor and received interviews for Harvard, Stanford, Columbia University, and the University of California, Berkeley, she was ultimately rejected from all applications. A friend who had "made a call" to one of the schools to inquire found that Sharp's letter of recommendation was unimpressive, as he had only discussed her work prior to joining his lab and mentioned nothing about her involvement in the split gene discovery. Berget went to speak with Nancy Hopkins about the issue, who herself went to speak with Sharp alongside David Botstein, explaining that not extending credit on the discovery to Berget would make him "look petty" and harm his own career in the process. In response, he gave a stronger letter of recommendation to Berget and this led to her being given job offers by Rice University and Carnegie Mellon University, of which she chose the former to become a professor of biochemistry. She remained in this faculty position from 1978 until 1989.

Berget moved on to become a professor at the Baylor College of Medicine with her research focusing on exons. In the mid-1990s, Berget was put in charge of a scientific misconduct inquiry into fellow Baylor professor Kimon Angelides and, over the course of 30 months, the inquiry board returned a guilty verdict for falsifying data in published papers and NIH grant applications. After Angelides was fired in 1995, he filed slander lawsuits against Berget and other inquiry members, which was only settled in 1999 after the NIH had an independent investigation confirm the validity of the guilty conclusion. During the early 2000s, Berget was made acting chair for the department of pharmacology despite being a biochemistry professor. Then, in May 2004, she was made vice president and vice dean of academic planning for the college of medicine.

== Research ==
=== Discovery of RNA splicing ===
While working in Phillip Sharp's lab in 1976, Berget started investigating RNA in the cellular cytoplasm and how they were connected to the structure of the genome of adenovirus. She used electron microscopy to visually inspect the structural differences. The lab's technician, Claire Moore, began using R-loop analysis to be able to map a string of RNA on a DNA template and hybridize them, allowing for the isolation of what genes the RNA was sequenced from. Using adenovirus to infect human cells, Berget then purified the messenger RNA (mRNA) from the virus replicating in the cells and hybridized them with the cellular human DNA with Moore and the R-loop analysis process. The R-loop micrographs had an unexpected discrepancy however, with the normal R-loops featuring pieces of RNA extending out from them. Other scientists had found that adenovirus RNA in the cell nucleus is generally longer than the RNA produced in the cytoplasm, so Berget, Moore, and Sharp decided they must just be artifacts that were added on during the hybridization process.

To fix this, they removed the opposite side of the DNA strand so the RNA sequence would have no competition in binding to its DNA strand counterpart, but the extended tails persisted. Multiple months and experiments to try and remove the tails by perfecting other parts of the hybridization process failed. But Berget's compilation of the data they had collected suggested that perhaps the tail sequences were from a different part of the adenovirus sequence, prompting them to use a longer DNA sequence from the human cells. This was successful, causing the tails to bind to a further part of the DNA and forming the R-loops, proving the discovery of RNA splicing and split genes. Berget, Moore, and Sharp had found out that the reason why nuclear mRNA is longer is because the cytoplasmic mRNA has introns spliced out to allow for protein synthesis. They published this finding in PNAS in August 1977.

=== Exons and splice sites ===
After establishing her own laboratory, Berget began work investigating the deeper features of RNA splicing and how introns and exons are processed and what biochemical mechanisms are involved. Using uridine triphosphate marked with a radioisotope, her lab was able to produce multiple radioactive RNA substrates for study each week, along with using HeLa cells to obtain nuclear DNA extracts. This led her to develop an exon definition model that explained how different splice sites allowed for cellular communication between one exon location and the others in a sequence during RNA transcription, making the sites dependent on each other. In the late 1980s, she found that by destroying specific snurps involved in splicing, she could prevent the process from happening at all.

Berget's lab proposed in a 1990 paper that for organisms with longer stretches of introns between each exon, such as vertebrates, that there must be some other system capable of identifying the exon sequences themselves. The paper noted that the existence of a downstream splicing location was necessary for an upstream intron to be spliced, giving credence to some sort of recognition complex of proteins. They expanded, in 1998, on the mechanisms of differential splicing choices, such as between the pre-mRNA for calcitonin versus CGRP, by showing that there is some sort of "splicing factor" that binds to the splicing site in order to cause polyadenylation upstream of that binding location.

== Organizations ==
Berget is a member of the advisory council for the Center for Scientific Review, which oversees 70% of the National Institute for Health's annual grant applications.

== Awards ==
Berget was given the 1996 Outstanding Achievement Award from the University of Minnesota for alumni who have made significant accomplishments in their scientific field.
