= Cellular dewetting =

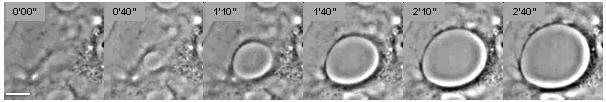
Figure 1. Snapshot images taken from a video showing the nucleation and growth of a TEM in an endothelial cell intoxicated with C3 exoenzyme from Clostridium botulinum for 24 hours, Bar = 10 μm. For the dynamics see Video.

Cellular dewetting refers to the process of nucleation and enlargement of transendothelial cell macroaperture (TEM) tunnels in endothelial cells (Figure 1). This phenomenon is analogous to the nucleation and growth of dry patches in viscous liquids spreading on a non-wettable substrate (Figure 2). Cellular dewetting is triggered by several protein toxins from pathogenic bacteria, notably the EDIN-like factors from Staphylococcus aureus and from Clostridium botulinum, as well as edema toxin from Bacillus anthracis. TEMs form in response to the rupture of cytoskeleton physical connections through the cytoplasm due to inhibition of the RhoA/ROCK pathway or to induction of the flux of cyclic-AMP (cAMP) broad signaling molecule.

== Physics behind cellular dewetting ==
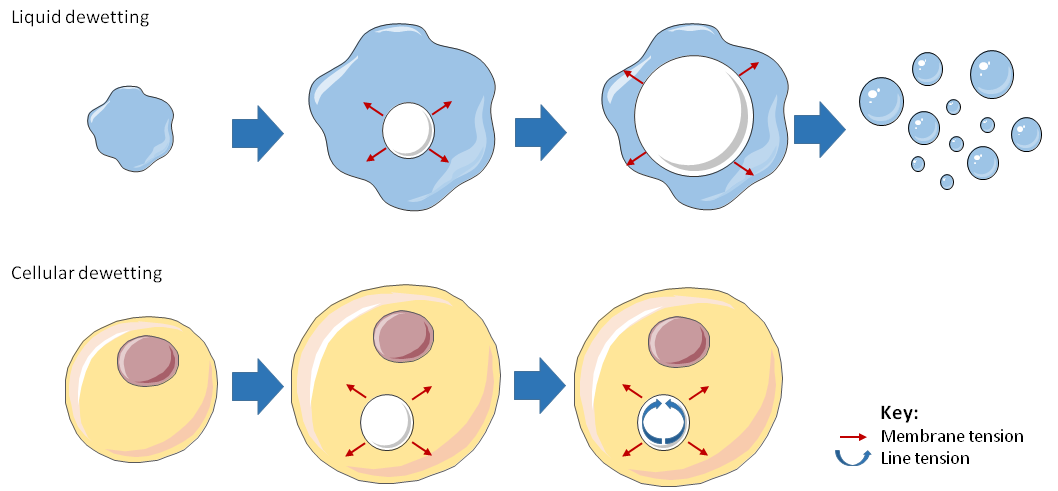
Figure 2. Analogy between liquid dewetting and cellular dewetting.

The phenomenon of cellular dewetting can be interpreted by physical modeling (Figure 2). The driving force responsible for the spontaneous formation of TEM tunnels and their opening is the membrane tension that results from the spreading of cells due to actomyosin relaxation. Opposite to liquid dewetting, TEMs reach a maximum diameter, at which the driving force is balanced by a resisting force that develops along TEM edges (Figure 2). This resisting force is referred to as line tension and is uncharacterized at the molecular level.

== Physical parameters ==
Driving forces pulling on a tunnel of radius R, as depicted in Figure 2. Here, pulling is due to the tensioning of the cell membrane (σ) that is partly counteracted by a line tension around the tunnel (T). In these conditions, the net driving force (F_{D}) consists of two contributions:

$F_D = \sigma - \frac{T}{R}$

Dewetting proceeds if F_{D}>0.

Membrane tension (σ) depends on the tunnel radius R. A tunnel increase in size relaxes the membrane, inducing a decrease in membrane tension, as described by Helfrich's law.

Line tension (T) corresponds to the resisting force along the edge of the tunnel that opposes membrane tension and limits dewetting. This line tension can have physical and molecular components.
