= Chou Te-wei (economist) =

Chinese Economist

- 周德偉
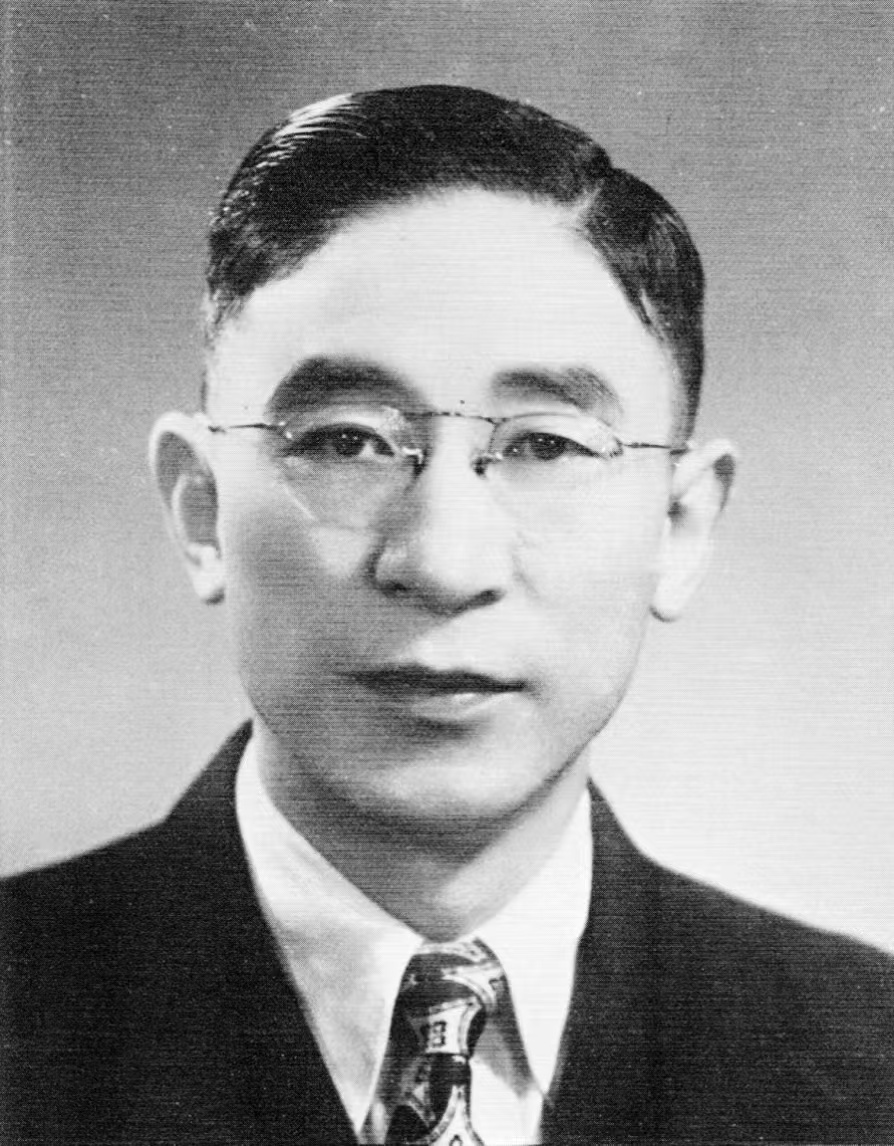
- Born: October 16, 1902; Hunan, China
- Died: 1986 (aged 83–84); Los Angeles, United States
- Education: Peking University (BS); London School of Economics (MSc); University of Berlin (PhD)
- Occupation: Economist
- Known for: Austrian economics, advocacy of liberalism
- Children: Louise T. Chow

Chou Te-wei (Chinese: 周德偉; pinyin: Zhōu Déwěi; October 16, 1902 – 1986) was a Chinese economist associated with the Austrian School and a political dissident under the Chiang Kai-shek government.

== Biography ==
A student of Ku Meng-yu and Friedrich Hayek, he was a member of Wang Jingwei's Reorganization Group and served as the head of the Customs Administration under the Ministry of Finance from 1950 to 1969.

While in Taiwan, Chou promoted liberalism and Hayekian thought, using Wistaria Tea House as a center for intellectual discussions. Prominent participants included Chang Fo-chuan, Yin Haiguang, Hsia Tao-ping, Hsu Tao-lin, and Li Ao. In 1975, he emigrated to the Los Angeles, United States due to political persecution and died there.

== Ideology ==
Chou is widely regarded as a classical liberal with Confucian characteristics. Chou, despite his support for constitutionalism, democracy, and liberalism, opposed Sun Yat-sen's economic revolution and Hu Shih's New Culture Movement. He once stated, "革命事業，只應革腐敗政府的命，不應革社會基礎的命，傳統文化是文化之積累，豈能一朝革盡？" (Revolutionary endeavors should only overthrow corrupt governments, not the foundations of society. Traditional culture is the accumulation of civilization—how could it be entirely overthrown in a single day?).

Chou is said to have referred to Chiang Kai-shek as "Damn Chiang(蔣該死)" which allegedly prompted the agents monitoring him to beg his wife to be less harsh with his criticism.

As a member of Reorganization Group, Chou maintained a positive view of Wang Jingwei throughout his life, arguing that Wang was the most resolute and strategic figure in resisting Japan. Chou contended that Wang recognized China's inability to wage war against Japan and sought to avoid conflict while waiting for international developments to shift in China's favor. In contrast, he criticized Chiang Kai-shek and Zhang Xueliang, asserting that neither had initially intended to resist Japan.

== Books ==
Chou wrote his autobiography, *Storm and Pen: My Life and the Kuomintang* (Chinese: 落筆驚風雨：我的一生與國民黨的點滴), but only completed the section covering his tenure at Hunan University. His work presented perspectives significantly different from the official Republic of China and Kuomintang historical narratives. He famously remarked, "If I do not write the history of the Kuomintang, the Kuomintang will never have a true history!" ("我不寫國民黨史，國民黨將永無真史！")
