= Douglas Prasher =

American molecular biologist

Douglas C. Prasher
- Born: August 1951 (age 75)
- Education: Ohio State University
- Scientific career
- Fields: Molecular biology

Douglas C. Prasher (born August 1951) is an American molecular biologist. He is known for his work to clone and sequence the genes for the photoprotein aequorin and green fluorescent protein (GFP) and for his proposal to use GFP as a tracer molecule. He communicated his pioneering work to Martin Chalfie and Roger Y. Tsien, but by 1991 he was unable to obtain further research funding, and left academia. Eventually, he had to abandon science. Chalfie and Tsien were awarded the 2008 Nobel Prize in Chemistry for work that they publicly acknowledged was substantially based on Prasher's work; through their efforts and those of others, he returned to scientific research in June 2010.

== Career ==
Prasher received his Ph.D. in biochemistry from the Ohio State University in 1979. From 1979 to 1983, he worked in genetics and biochemistry research at the University of Georgia, where he identified the gene sequence for aequorin. He then joined the Biology Department of the Woods Hole Oceanographic Institution, Woods Hole, Massachusetts where he studied bioluminescence. In 1988, he received a two-year, $200,000 grant from the American Cancer Society to clone the gene for green fluorescent protein (GFP), the protein that gives the jellyfish its glow. Prasher succeeded in this project, and later shared his findings with Martin Chalfie and Roger Tsien after each scientist had communicated with him.

Reports that Prasher had difficulty in achieving fluorescence of GFP in other species in recombinant studies are inaccurate, as Prasher had successfully worked with the Chalfie group to show recombinant expression in the bacterium E. coli and the nematode C. elegans, and later in the plant Arabidopsis thaliana. By the time Prasher's ACS funding ended, he had isolated a partial, but almost complete gfp cDNA, with 965 bases out of the 1,050 bases of the corresponding mRNA. It would require construction of another cDNA library during the following (non-funded) year for Prasher to isolate a full-length cDNA clone, although this partial cDNA clone was subsequently used and found to be sufficient for successful heterologous expression in E. coli, C. elegans and A. thaliana. By this time, Prasher could not afford to devote limited resources to expression studies in E. coli. It wasn't until the Nobel Prize announcement that it became clear how unfortunate this had been. Chalfie and Tsien went on to their successful expression studies. GFP has subsequently found application as a biochemical tracer in areas such as fluorescent studies of gene expression.

Prasher had applied to the National Institutes of Health for funding but had been turned down, and by the time he was undergoing review for promotion from assistant to untenured associate, he had decided to leave academia. Subsequently, Prasher worked for the Animal & Plant Health Inspection Service, U.S. Department of Agriculture at its Otis Plant Protection Center in Cape Cod, Massachusetts as a population geneticist, and was later transferred to the Plant Germplasm Quarantine & Biotechnology Laboratory in Beltsville, Maryland. After a mild heart attack, he went to work for NASA subcontractor AZ Technology in Huntsville, Alabama, working on an existing project to develop hand-held devices to monitor cabin environment and to perform human diagnostics during long-term spaceflight. A year and a half later, he lost his job when NASA reorganized and canceled the project.

On October 8, 2008, the 2008 Nobel Prize in Chemistry was awarded to Osamu Shimomura, Chalfie, and Tsien for their work on GFP. Prasher was not included among the Nobel laureates, as only three individuals can share in a single Nobel Prize. Chalfie said of Prasher's contribution: "(Prasher's) work was critical and essential for the work we did in our lab. They could've easily given the prize to Douglas and the other two and left me out." Tsien also agreed that they couldn't have done it without Prasher and "Doug Prasher had a very important role."

In an October 9, 2008 phone interview with NPR and October 14, 2008 TV interview with Inside Edition, Prasher reported that he was unable to find a job in science, his life savings had run out, and he was working as a courtesy shuttle bus driver for a Toyota dealership in Huntsville at $8.50 an hour. In the NPR broadcast, one of his former colleagues called Prasher's current situation a "staggering waste of talent". Prasher stated his wish to resume a career in science but not particularly with jellyfish. He also expressed his pleasure at learning of the Nobel Prize awarded to Shimomura, Chalfie, and Tsien: "I'm really happy for them. I was really surprised that particular topic carried that much weight."

Chalfie and Tsien invited Prasher and his wife, Virginia Eckenrode, to attend the Nobel Prize ceremony, as their guests and at their expense. All three of the 2008 Chemistry laureates thanked Prasher in their speeches.

In June 2010, Prasher was finally able to return to science, working for Streamline Automation in Huntsville until December 2011, and then from 2012 to 2015 in Tsien's lab at the University of California, San Diego.

== Publications ==
- Prasher, D., McCann, R.O., Cormier, M.J. "Cloning and expression of the cDNA coding for aequorin, a bioluminescent calcium-binding protein". Biochem. Biophys. Res. Comm., 126, 1259-1268 (1985).
- Richard, J.P., Prasher, D.C., Ives, D.H., Frey, P.A. "Chiral [^{18}O]phosphorothioates. The stereochemical course of thiophosphoryl group transfer catalyzed by nucleoside phosphotransferase". J. Biol. Chem., 254 (11), 4339-4341 (1979).
- Prasher, D.C., Carr, M.C., Ives, D.H., Tsai, T.C., Frey, P.A. "Nucleoside phosphotransferase from barley. Characterization and evidence for ping pong kinetics involving phosphoryl enzyme". J. Biol. Chem., 257 (9), 4931-4939 (1982).
- Prasher, D.C., Conarro, L., Kushner, S.R. "Amplification and purification of exonuclease I from Escherichia coli K12". J. Biol. Chem., 258 (10), 6340-6343 (1983)
- Prasher, D.C., McCann, R.O., Longiaru, M., Cormier, M.J. "Sequence comparisons of complementary DNAs encoding aequorin isotypes". Biochemistry, 26 (5), 1326-1332 (1987).
- Phillips, G.J., Prasher, D.C., Kushner, S.R. "Physical and biochemical characterization of cloned sbcB and xonA mutations from Escherichia coli K-12". J. Bacteriol., 170 (5), 2089-2094 (1988).
- Cormier, M.J., Prasher, D.C., Longiaru, M., McCann, R.O. "The enzymology and molecular biology of the Ca2+-activated photoprotein, aequorin". Photochem. Photobiol., 49 (4), 509-512 (1989).
- Prasher, D.C., O'Kane, D., Lee, J., Woodward, B. "The lumazine protein gene in Photobacterium phosphoreum is linked to the lux operon". Nucleic Acids Res., 18 (21), 6450 (1990).
- O'Kane, D.J., Woodward, B., Lee, J., Prasher, D.C. "Borrowed proteins in bacterial bioluminescence". Proc. Natl. Acad. Sci. USA, 88 (4), 1100-1104 (1991).
- O'Kane, D.J., Prasher, D.C. "Evolutionary origins of bacterial bioluminescence". Mol. Microbiol., 6 (4), 443-449 (1992).
- Prasher, D.C., Eckenrode, V.K., Ward, W.W., Prendergast F.G., Cormier, M.J. "Primary structure of the Aequorea victoria green-fluorescent protein". Gene, 111 (2), 229-233 (1992).
- Hannick, L.I., Prasher, D.C., Schultz, L.W., Deschamps, J.R., Ward, K.B. "Preparation and initial characterization of crystals of the photoprotein aequorin from Aequorea victoria". Proteins, 15 (1), 103-107 (1993).
- Cody, C.W., Prasher, D.C., Westler, W.M., Prendergast, F.G., Ward, W.W. "Chemical structure of the hexapeptide chromophore of the Aequorea green-fluorescent protein". Biochemistry, 32 (5), 1212-1218 (1993).
- Chalfie, M., Tu, Y., Euskirchen, G., Ward, W.W., Prasher, D.C. "Green fluorescent protein as a marker for gene expression". Science, 263 (5148), 802-805 (1994).
- Heim, R., Prasher, D.C., Tsien, R.Y. "Wavelength mutations and posttranslational autoxidation of green fluorescent protein". Proc. Natl. Acad. Sci. USA, 91 (26), 12501-12504 (1994).
- Prasher, D.C. "Using GFP to see the light". Trends Genet., 11 (8), 320-323 (1995).
- Haseloff, J., Siemering, K.R., Prasher, D.C., Hodge, S. "Removal of a cryptic intron and subcellular localization of green fluorescent protein are required to mark transgenic Arabidopsis plants brightly". Proc. Natl. Acad. Sci. USA, 94 (6), 2122-2127 (1997).
- Bernon, G., Schander, C., Prasher, D., Robinson, D., "Survey and status of terrestrial slugs in North America American Malacological Society Abstracts 2000, 41 (2000).
- Barr, NB, Cook, A., Elder, P., Molongoski, J., Prasher, D., Robinson D.G. "Application of a DNA barcode using the 16S rRNA gene to diagnose pest Arion species in the USA". J. Moll. Stud. 75: 187-191 (2009).

== See also ==
- Nobel Prize controversies
