= Dewetting =

Retraction of a fluid from a surface it was forced to cover

In fluid mechanics, dewetting is one of the processes that can occur at a solid–liquid, solid–solid, or liquid–liquid interface. Generally, dewetting describes the process of retraction of a fluid from a non-wettable surface it was forced to cover. The opposite process—spreading of a liquid on a substrate—is called wetting. The factor determining the spontaneous spreading and dewetting for a drop of liquid placed on a solid substrate with ambient gas, is the so-called spreading coefficient S:

Surface tension diagram of a liquid droplet on a solid substrate. The surface of the liquid has the shape of a spherical cap, due to Laplace pressure

$$S\ = \gamma_\text{SG} - \gamma_\text{SL} - \gamma_\text{LG}$$

where γ_{SG} is the solid-gas surface tension, γ_{SL} is the solid-liquid surface tension and γ_{LG} is the liquid-gas surface tension (measured for the mediums before they are brought in contact with each other).

When S > 0, the spontaneous spreading occurs, and if S < 0, partial wetting is observed, meaning the liquid will only cover the substrate to some extent.

The equilibrium contact angle $\theta_\text{c}$ is determined from the Young–Laplace equation.

Spreading and dewetting are important processes for many applications, including adhesion, lubrication, painting, printing, and protective coating. For most applications, dewetting is an unwanted process, because it destroys the applied liquid film.

Dewetting can be inhibited or prevented by photocrosslinking the thin film prior to annealing, or by incorporating nanoparticle additives into the film.

Surfactants can have a significant effect on the spreading coefficient. When a surfactant is added, its amphiphilic properties cause it to be more energetically favorable to migrate to the surface, decreasing the interfacial tension and thus increasing the spreading coefficient (i.e. making S more positive). As more surfactant molecules are absorbed into the interface, the free energy of the system decreases in tandem to the surface tension decreasing, eventually causing the system to become completely wetting.

In biology, by analogy with the physics of liquid dewetting, the process of tunnel formation through endothelial cells has been referred to as cellular dewetting.

== Dewetting of polymer thin films ==
In most dewetting studies a thin polymer film is spin-cast onto a substrate. Even in the case of $S<0$ the film does not dewet immediately if it is in a metastable state, e.g. if the temperature is below the glass transition temperature of the polymer. Annealing such a metastable film above its glass transition temperature increases the mobility of the polymer-chain molecules and dewetting takes place.

The process of dewetting occurs by the nucleation and growth of randomly formed holes, which coalesce to form a network of filaments, before breaking into droplets. When starting from a continuous film, an irregular pattern of droplets is formed. The droplet size and droplet spacing may vary over several orders of magnitude, since the dewetting starts from randomly formed holes in the film. There is no spatial correlation between the dry patches that develop. These dry patches grow and the material is accumulated in the rim surrounding the growing hole. In the case where the initially homogeneous film is thin (in the range of 100 nm), a polygon network of connected strings of material is formed, like a Voronoi pattern of polygons. These strings then can break up into droplets, a process which is known as the Plateau-Rayleigh instability. At other film thicknesses, other complicated patterns of droplets on the substrate can be observed, which stem from a fingering instability of the growing rim around the dry patch.

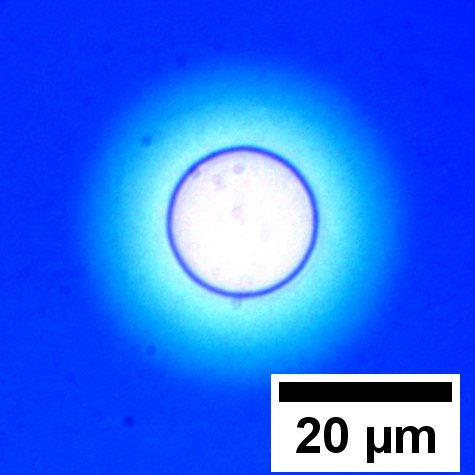
Circular hole formed in a 100 nm thick film of polystyrene. The blue color of the film is due to Structural coloration and depends on the film's thickness.

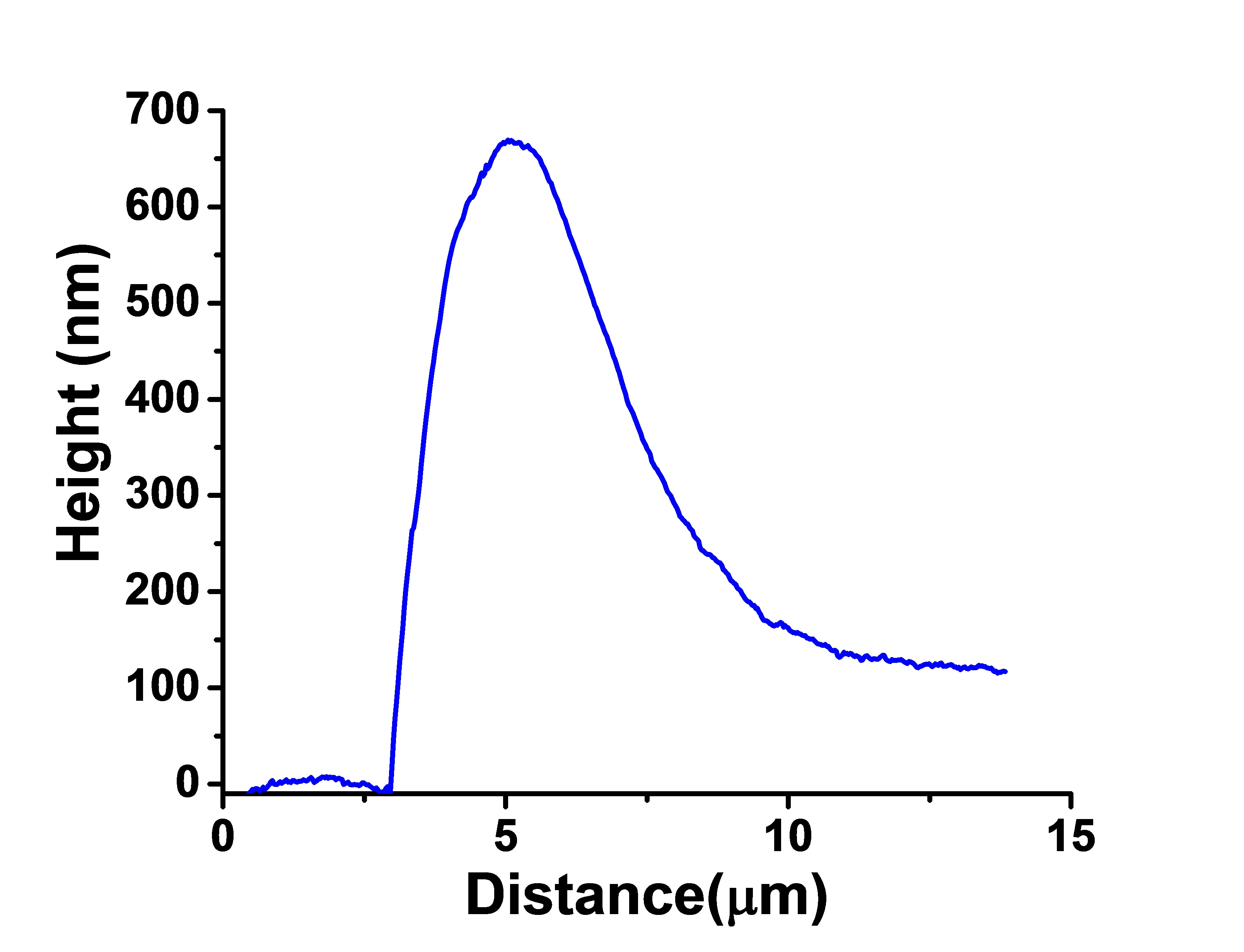
AFM height profile of a dewetting hole's rim. Notice that the material that is removed by dewetting is accumulated at the rim around the hole; initial film thickness (height): 100 nm.

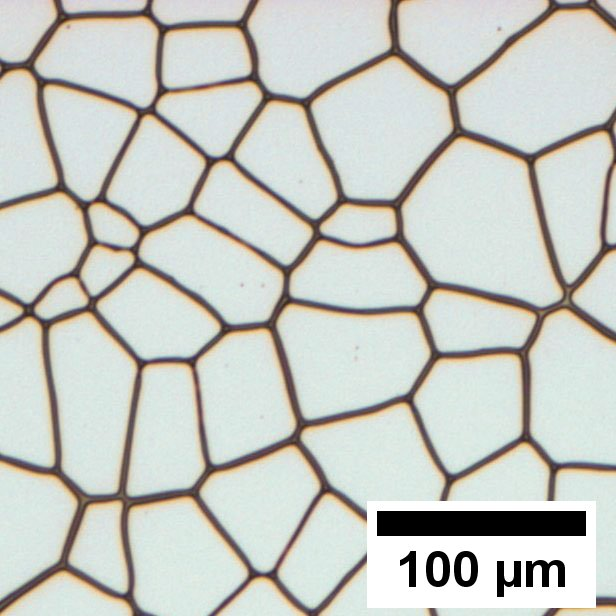
Voronoi tessellation pattern of polygons achieved by the coalescence of dewetting holes.

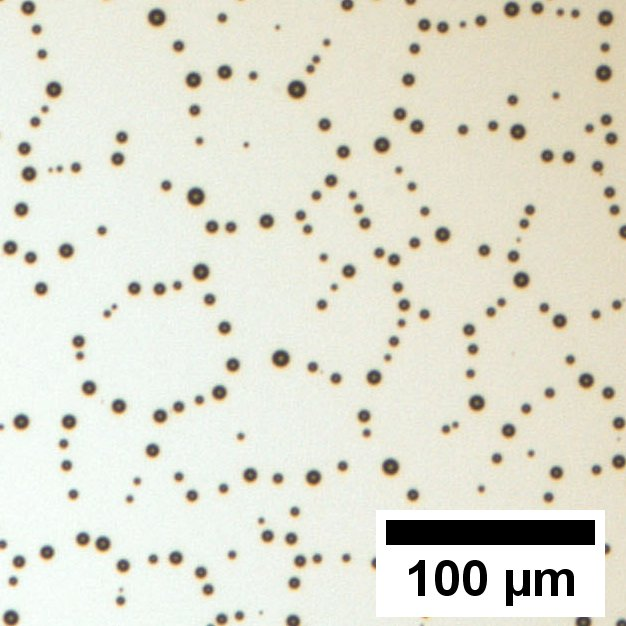
If given enough time, this network of polygons decays into separate droplets.

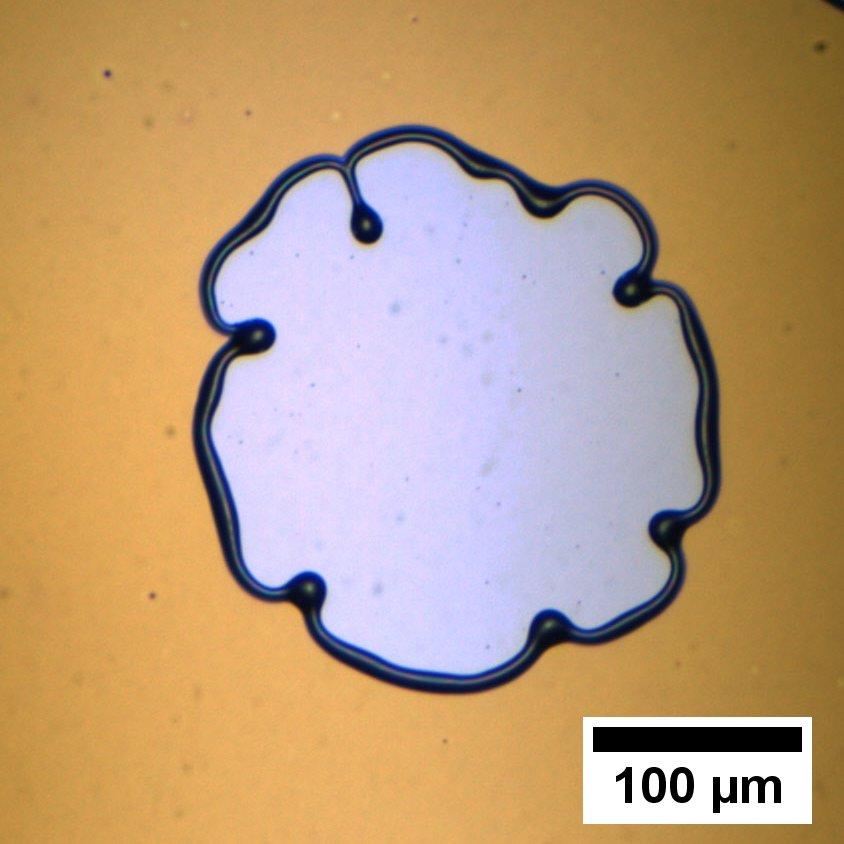
Rim instability in the case of a thicker (200 nm) polystyrene film.

== Dewetting of metal thin films ==
Solid-state dewetting of the metal thin films describe the transformation of a thin film into an energetically favoured set of droplets or particles at temperatures well below the melting point. The driving force for dewetting is the minimization of the total energy of the free surfaces of the film and substrate as well as of the film-substrate interface. The dedicated heating stage in SEM has been widely used to accurately control sample temperature through a thermocouple to observe the in-situ behaviour of the material, and can be recorded as a video format. Meanwhile, the two-dimensional morphology can be directly observed and characterised. ie. the partially dewetted Ni film is itself a workable fuel electrode for SOCs as it provides long triple phase boundary (TPB) lines if the structure is fine enough, the connectivity of the nickel and pore phases as well as the TPB lines can be used for SOFC characterisation.
