= Angiocrine growth factors =

Angiocrine growth factors are molecules found in blood vessels' endothelial cells that can stimulate organ-specific repair activities in damaged or diseased organs. Endothelial cells possess tissue-specific genes that code for unique growth factors, adhesion molecules and factors regulating metabolism.

The discovery emerged after the entirety of active genes in endothelial cells was decoded, resulting in an atlas of organ-specific blood vessel cells. The atlas documented hundreds of already-known genes that had never been associated with these cells. Organs dictate the structure and function of their own blood vessels, including the repair molecules they secrete. Each organ produces blood vessels with unique shape and function that comply that organ's metabolic demands.

== Organ repair ==
When an organ is injured, its blood vessels may not be able to repair the damage because they may themselves be damaged or inflamed. An infusion of engineered endothelial cells may be able to engraft into injured tissue and acquire the capacity to repair the organ.

Endothelial cells generated from mouse embryonic stem cells were functional, transplantable and responsive to microenvironmental signals. Such cells can be transplanted into different tissues, become educated by the tissue and acquire the characteristic phenotype of that organ type's endothelials. Such cells were transplanted into the liver and kidney of mice and found became indistinguishable from existing endothelial cells.

In a clinical setting the cells must be immunocompatible with the recipient patient. They could be derived from the patient's embryonic pluripotent stem cells as well as by somatic cell nuclear transfer (SCNT). In SCNT the nucleus is introduced into a human egg producing embryonic stem cells that are a genetic match of the patient. Another approach takes cells discarded after a diagnostic prenatal amniocentesis.

Additional preclinical investigation is required before investigation with humans.
