= Wistaria Tea House =

Coordinates: 25.0246348°N 121.5343317°E

Wistaria Tea House 紫藤廬
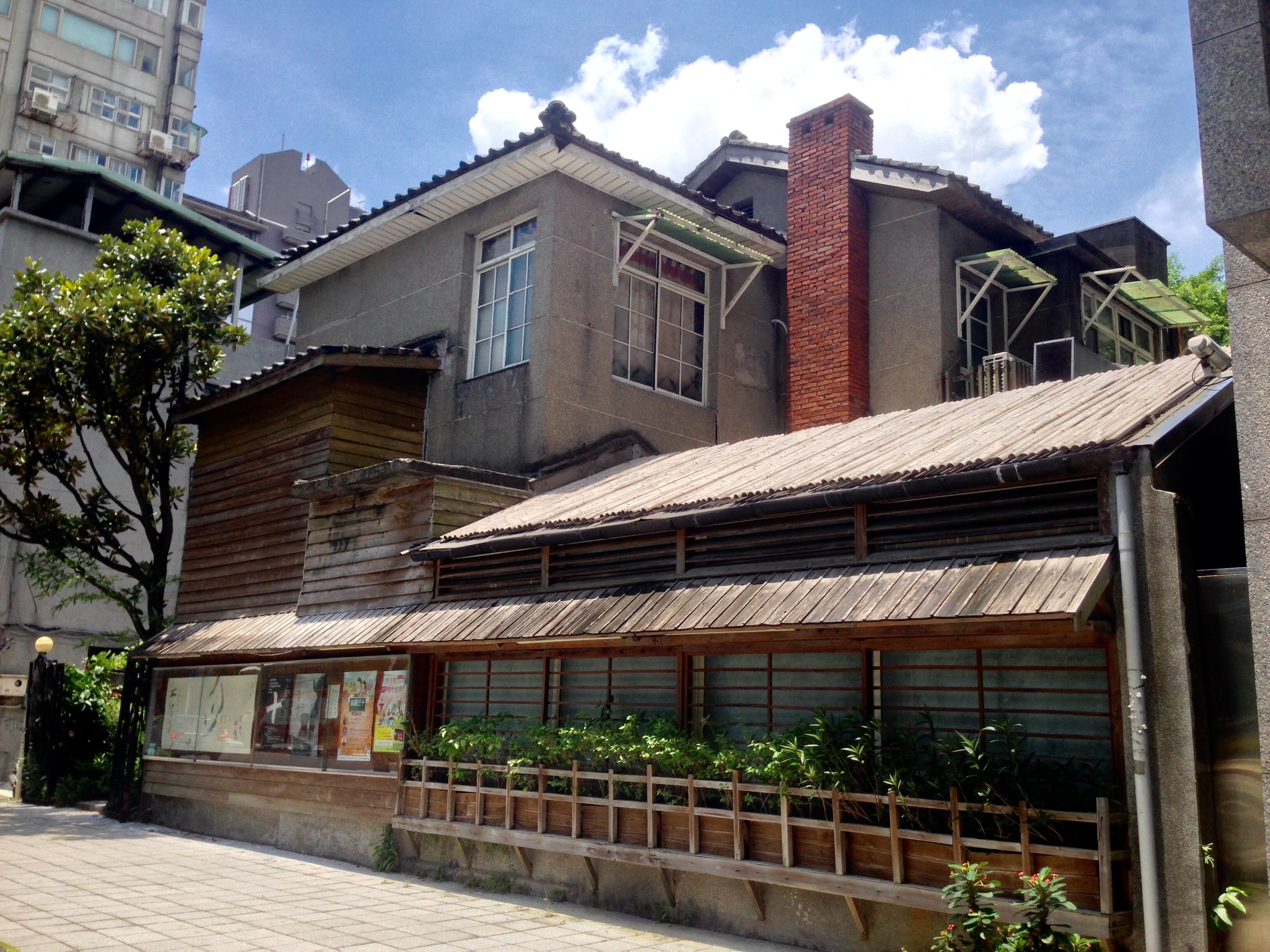
- Interactive map of Wistaria Tea House 紫藤廬

Restaurant information
- Established: 1981
- Owner: Wistaria Cultural Association
- Location: Daan, Taipei, Taiwan

The Wistaria Tea House (Chinese: 紫藤廬; pinyin: Zǐténg Lú), the Wisteria House, or Wistaria House is a historical teahouse in Daan District, Taipei, Taiwan. The establishment is situated in a Japanese-style wooden house built in the 1920s on Xinsheng South Road. The teahouse is named after the three wisteria vines planted in the front courtyard forming a shaded area leading to the entrance of the building. The teahouse, with its circa 1930s decor, was reopened to much fanfare after a long needed renovation in 2008.

The teahouse was used during the filming of Eat Drink Man Woman.

== History ==
The house served as a residence for the Governor-General of Taiwan under Japanese rule prior to 1945 and became government dormitories under the Republic of China administration in 1950. The building became a teahouse and gained its present name in 1981 and was meeting place for political dissidents such as Lei Chen (雷震) fighting for a democratic Taiwan during the 1980s after Kuomintang liberal Chou Te-wei moved in. Since then, Wisteria House has been and continues to be a favored meeting place for Taipei literati, artists, and academics. It has since been designated as a historic monument by the Taipei government in 1997 and operation of the teahouse was turned over to the Wistaria Cultural Association by the Taipei City Cultural Bureau.

== Gallery ==
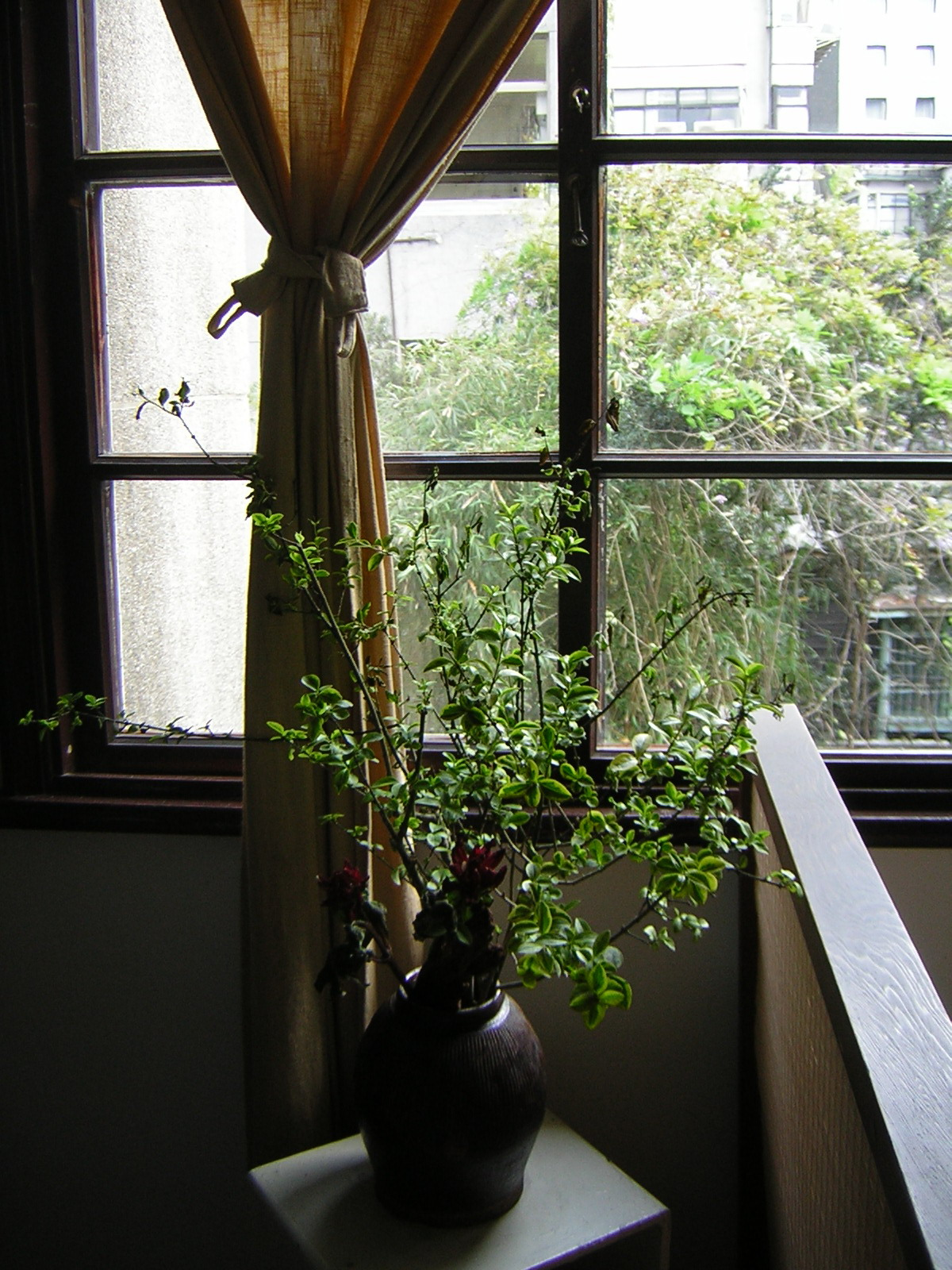
View from the second floor

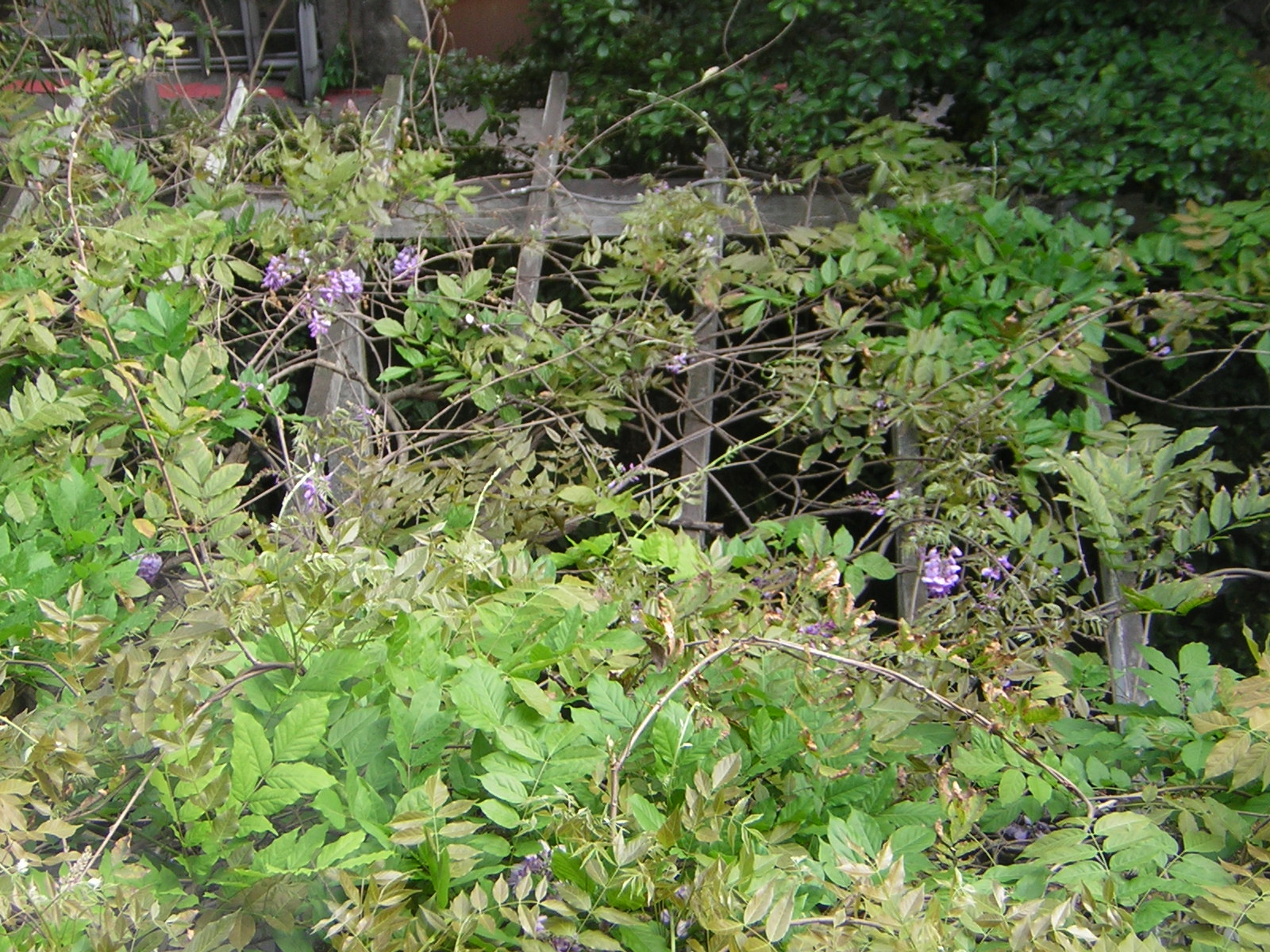
Trellis supporting the wisteria vines

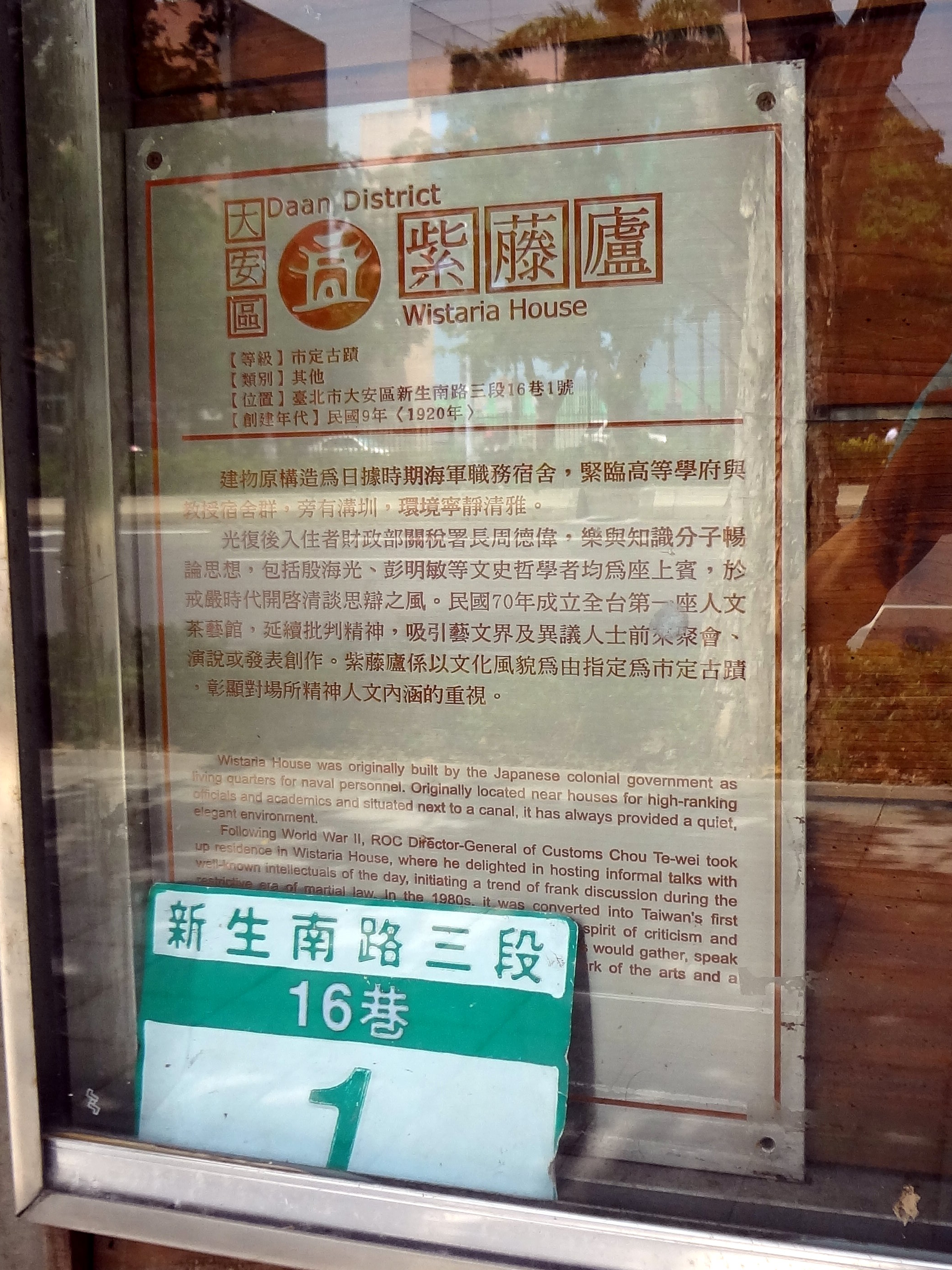
Plaque describing the Wisteria Tea House
