= Louise Chow =

Professor of biochemistry and molecular genetics

Louise Tsi Chow
- 周芷
- Born: Hunan, China
- Citizenship: Republic of China (Taiwan)
- Education: National Taiwan University (BS); California Institute of Technology (PhD)
- Known for: RNA splicing
- Scientific career
- Fields: Biochemistry; Molecular genetics
- Workplaces: University of Alabama at Birmingham; Cold Spring Harbor Laboratory; University of California, San Francisco
- Thesis: Genetic Sequences by Electron Microscopy (1973)
- Doctoral advisor: Norman Davidson

Louise Tsi Chow (Chinese: 周芷; pinyin: Zhōu Zhǐ) is a Taiwanese biochemist and molecular geneticist. She is a professor of biochemistry and molecular genetics at the University of Alabama at Birmingham and a foreign associate with the National Academy of Sciences, known for her research on the human papillomavirus. Her research contributed to the discovery of gene splicing, and in 1993, her collaborator, Richard J. Roberts, received the Nobel Prize for the research, leading some to assert that Chow should have received the honor as well.

== Early life and education ==
Chow was born in Hunan, Republic of China. Her father, Chou Te-wei, was a well known economist who worked in the Ministry of Finance on Taiwan and had been a student of Nobel laureate Friedrich Hayek.

Chow graduated from National Taiwan University with a Bachelor of Science in agricultural chemistry in 1965. She then moved to the U.S. to purse doctoral studies in chemistry at the California Institute of Technology, where she earned her Ph.D. in 1973 under Norman Davidson. She then undertook post-doctoral training at the University of California, San Francisco, researching the monkey tumor virus SV40.

== Career ==
Chow and her husband, fellow scientist Thomas Broker, joined Cold Spring Harbor Laboratory in 1975. It was here that, in the process of studying the genetic organization, DNA transcription, and RNA translation of adenoviruses, she and her colleagues discovered RNA splicing in 1977. This finding led to her collaborator, Richard Roberts, winning the 1993 Nobel Prize in Physiology or Medicine (shared with Phillip Sharp from MIT whose team independently made the discovery). Many feel that Chow deserved a share of the prize (see Nobel Prize controversy).

In 1984, she took a job with the University of Rochester School of Medicine, studying the genome of the human papillomavirus (HPV). Chow became a professor at the University of Alabama at Birmingham (UAB) in 1993, studying genetics and virology, focusing on diseases such as cancer, cystic fibrosis, and AIDS.

At UAB, Chow developed a method to produce large amounts of one of the most dominant cancer-causing HPV strains, HPV-18, in the laboratory, enabling her and her team to study HPV's entire replicative cycle.

== Nobel Prize controversy ==
In 1993, her collaborator at Cold Spring Harbor Laboratory, Richard J. Roberts, was awarded the Nobel Prize, along with researcher Phillip Sharp, for the discovery of RNA splicing. Roberts called the award a "tribute" to his co-workers, including Chow. However, other scientists felt that Chow, who operated the electron microscope that allowed researchers to observe the splicing process, should have been included among the scientists awarded the Nobel Prize for the research. Chow told the Boston Globe that her contributions "were not trivial ... it was a new type of experiment and needed to be designed and set up."

== Key publications ==
- Chow, L. T.; Gelinas, R. E.; Broker, T. R.; Roberts, R. J. (September 1977). "An amazing sequence arrangement at the 5' ends of adenovirus 2 messenger RNA". Cell. 12 (1): 1–8. doi:10.1016/0092-8674(77)90180-5. ISSN 0092-8674. PMID 902310. S2CID 2099968.

== Selected honors ==
- Foreign Associate of the National Academy of Sciences, 2012
- Member of Academia Sinica
