= Robert F. Furchgott =

American biochemist (1916–2009)

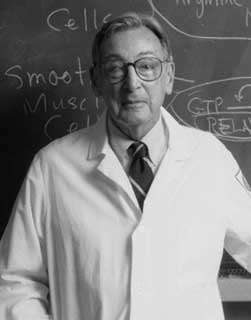
- Portrait of Furchgott
- Born: Robert Francis Furchgott; June 4, 1916; Charleston, South Carolina, U.S.
- Died: May 19, 2009 (aged 92); Seattle, Washington, U.S.
- Education: University of North Carolina at Chapel Hill; Northwestern University
- Known for: Recognition of nitric oxide as a cellular signal
- Spouse(s): Lenore Mandelbaum (1941–1983; her death; 3 children); Margaret Gallagher Roth (?–2006; her death)
- Awards: Nobel Prize in Physiology or Medicine in 1998
- Scientific career
- Fields: Biochemistry
- Workplaces: Cornell University (1940–1949); Washington University in St. Louis (1949–1956); SUNY Downstate Medical Center (1956–2009); University of Miami (1989-2009)

Signature
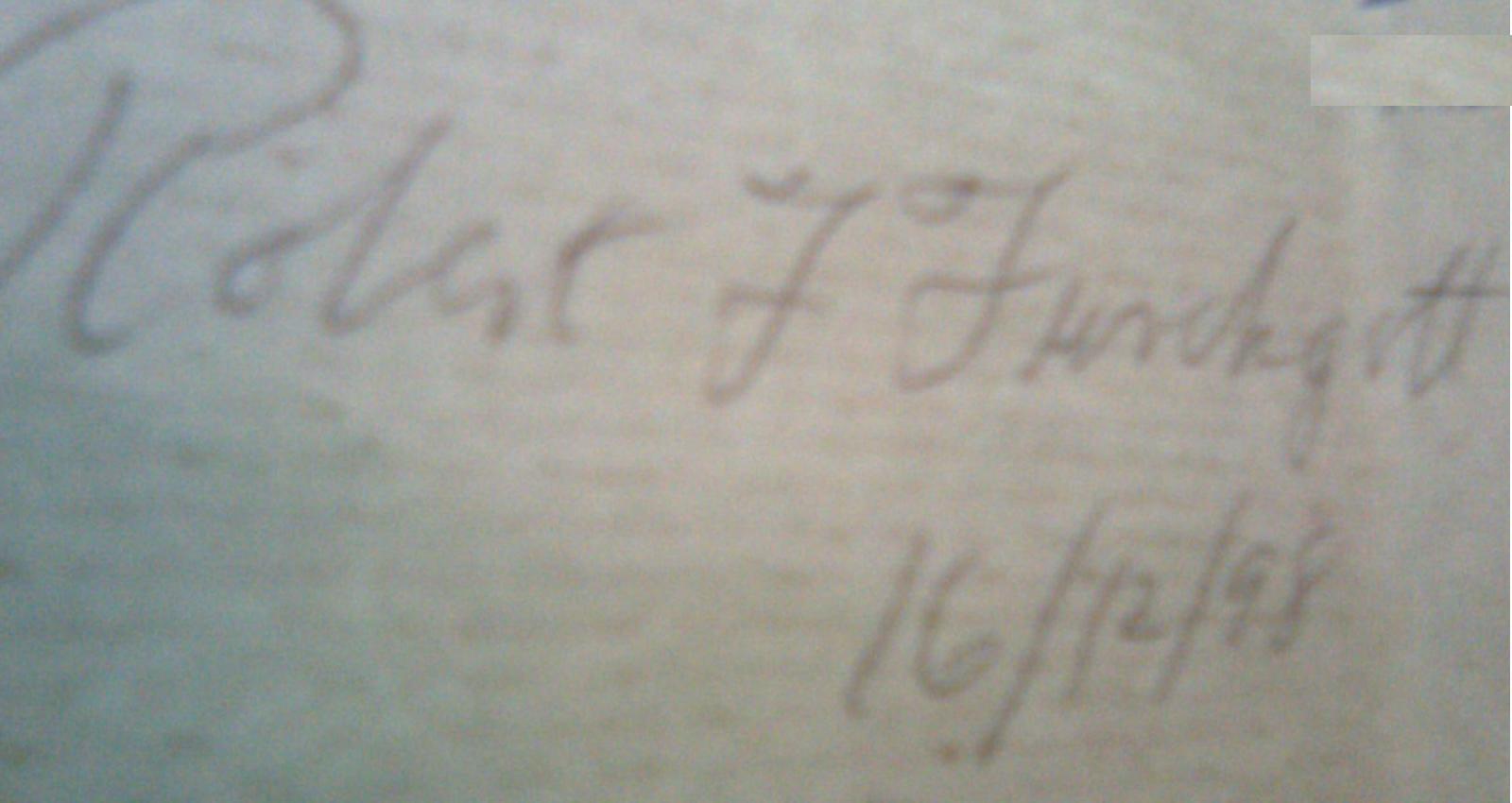

Robert Francis Furchgott (June 4, 1916 – May 19, 2009) was an American Nobel Prize winning biochemist who contributed to the discovery of nitric oxide as a transient cellular signal in mammalian systems.

== Early life and education ==
Furchgott was born in Charleston, South Carolina, to Arthur Furchgott (December 1884 – January 1971), a department store owner, and Pena (Sorentrue) Furchgott. He graduated from the University of North Carolina at Chapel Hill in 1937 with a degree in chemistry and went on to earn a Ph.D in biochemistry at Northwestern University in 1940.

== Career ==
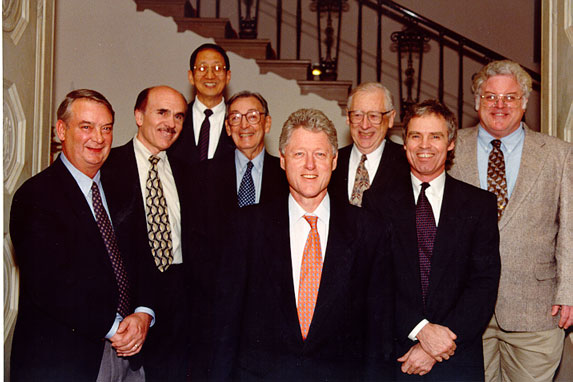
Furchgott and other 1998 Nobel Prize winners with former U.S. President Bill Clinton, November 1998

Furchgott was faculty member and professor of pharmacology at Cornell University Medical College from 1940 to 1949, at Washington University School of Medicine from 1949 to 1956, at SUNY Brooklyn from 1956 to 1989, and at the University of Miami from 1989 through the end of his career.

In 1978, Furchgott discovered a substance in endothelial cells that relaxes blood vessels, calling it endothelium-derived relaxing factor (EDRF). By 1986, he had worked out EDRF's nature and mechanism of action, and determined that EDRF was in fact nitric oxide (NO), an important compound in many aspects of cardiovascular physiology. This research is important in explaining a wide variety of neuronal, cardiovascular, and general physiologic processes of central importance in human health and disease.

In addition to receiving the Nobel Prize in Physiology or Medicine for the discovery of nitric oxide as a new cellular signal in 1998 with Louis Ignarro and Ferid Murad, Furchgott's discovery that nitric oxide causes blood vessels to dilate provided a long-sought explanation for the therapeutic effects of nitroglycerin used to treat angina pectoris and was later instrumental in the development of the erectile dysfunction treatment drug Viagra.

In 1991, Furchgott received a Gairdner Foundation International Award for his groundbreaking discoveries. He also received the Albert Lasker Award for Basic Medical Research in 1996 and the Golden Plate Award of the American Academy of Achievement in 1999 with Ferid Murad.

== Personal life ==
Furchgott was Jewish and lived most of his married and career life in Woodmere, New York on Long Island. He was married to Lenore Mandelbaum (February 1915 – April 1983) from 1941 until her death at age 68. They had three daughters: Jane, Terry, and Susan. His daughter, Susan, was an artist in the San Francisco counter-culture and co-founder of the Kerista Commune.

Furchgott spent his later years with Margaret Gallagher Roth, who died March 14, 2006. He served as a professor emeritus at the State University of New York Downstate Medical Center. In 2008, he moved to Seattle's Ravenna neighborhood.

== Death ==
Furchgott died on May 19, 2009, in Seattle. He is survived by his three daughters, four grandchildren, and three great-grandchildren.

== See also ==
- List of Jewish Nobel laureates
