= Louis Ignarro =

American pharmacologist

Louis Joseph Ignarro
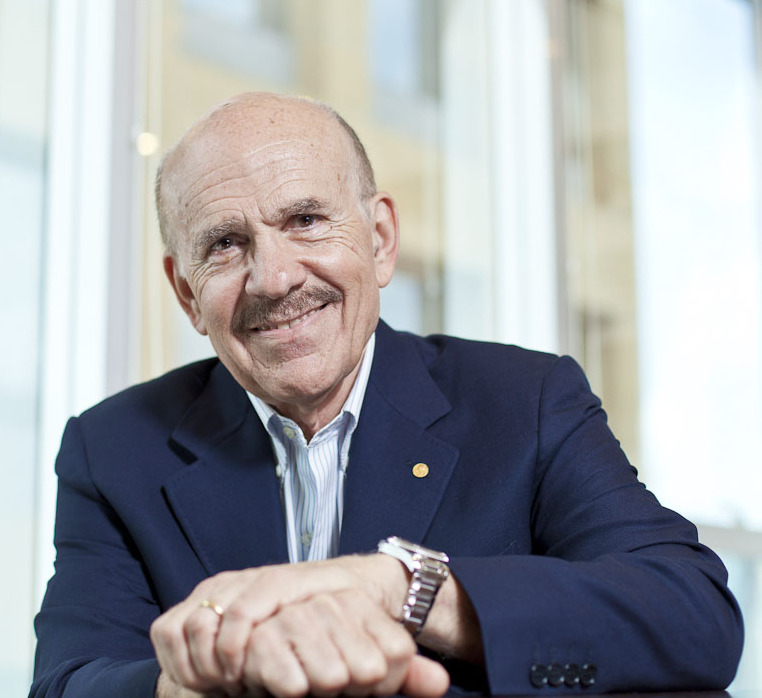
- Ignarro in 2013
- Born: May 31, 1941 (age 85); Brooklyn, NY, U.S.
- Education: Columbia University; University of Minnesota
- Known for: Nitric Oxide
- Awards: Nobel Prize in Physiology or Medicine (1998)
- Scientific career
- Fields: Pharmacology
- Workplaces: Tulane University School of Medicine; UCLA School of Medicine; King Saud University

Louis Joseph Ignarro (born May 31, 1941) is an American pharmacologist. For demonstrating the signaling properties of nitric oxide, he was co-recipient of the 1998 Nobel Prize in Physiology or Medicine with Robert F. Furchgott and Ferid Murad.

Currently, he is professor emeritus of pharmacology at the UCLA School of Medicine's department of molecular and medical pharmacology in Los Angeles, which he joined in 1985. Before relocating to California, he was a professor of pharmacology at Tulane University School of Medicine, New Orleans, for 12 years. Ignarro has also previously worked as a staff scientist, research department, for the pharmaceutical division of CIBA-GEIGY Corporation in New York.

Ignarro has published numerous research articles. He received the Basic Research Prize of the American Heart Association in 1998. This was in recognition of his outstanding contributions to the advancement of cardiovascular science. That same year, he was inducted into the National Academy of Sciences and the following year, into the American Academy of Arts and Sciences. Because nitric oxide is indirectly involved in the action of this drug, he is sometimes referred to as the "Father of Viagra".

He is the founder of the Nitric Oxide Society, and founder and editor-in-chief of Nitric Oxide Biology and Chemistry. Ignarro holds a B.S. in pharmacy, Columbia University, 1962, and a Ph.D. in pharmacology, University of Minnesota, School of Medicine, 1966. He also received a postdoctoral fellowship in chemical pharmacology from National Institutes of Health in 1968. He is a member of the scientific committee of Nicox, a French pharmaceutical company, a member of the Board of Directors of Antibe Therapeutics, a Canadian drug discovery company, a member of the Board of Directors of Operation USA, a non-profit organization, and is past member of the Nutritional Advisory Board for Herbalife, a multi-level marketing company.

== Personal life ==
Louis J. Ignarro was born in 1941 in Brooklyn, New York. His parents were Italian immigrants and his father was a carpenter in Torre del Greco, near Naples. Ignarro grew up in Long Beach, New York, which is a suburb of New York City on the south shore of Long Island. Ignarro received his first chemistry set as a gift at the age of 8.

Ignarro is married to anesthesiologist Dr. Sharon Ignarro and lives in Beverly Hills, California. He is an avid model railroader, cyclist, and marathoner, having completed 13 marathons. Ignarro has published multiple books for lay audiences about health and wellness focusing on the benefits of increasing nitric oxide production. He is a frequent public speaker on these and related topics.

== Academic career ==
Ignarro attended Central Grade School and Long Beach High School. A strong interest in science led Ignarro to Columbia University where he studied chemistry and pharmacology and in 1962 received a bachelor's degree in pharmacy from the Columbia University College of Pharmaceutical Sciences. Ignarro then attended the University of Minnesota where he received a Ph.D. in pharmacology. His university studies also concentrated in chemistry, enzymology and cardiovascular physiology, which resulted in several published papers. While at the University of Minnesota, Ignarro studied under eventual Nobel Prize-winning chemist Paul Boyer.

Ignarro's work continued at the NIH in the fields he had studied, collaborating with many other scientists to discover regulatory mechanisms of the cardiovascular system that would lead to his most famous work. In 1968, Ignarro left the NIH to work for Geigy Pharmaceuticals. With this company, Ignarro helped develop new drugs and was able to continue research into new areas of pharmacology including cyclic GMP. After Geigy merged with Ciba Pharmaceuticals, Ignarro decided to move back to the world of academia, this time as a professor.

In 1973, Ignarro accepted a position of assistant professor of pharmacology at Tulane University School of Medicine in New Orleans. Tulane was chosen partially because it would provide a good environment for continued research into cyclic GMP. While studying cyclic GMP, Ignarro read a paper by Ferid Murad, who demonstrated that nitric oxide elevates cyclic GMP levels. Ignarro then speculated that nitric oxide could be the key to relaxing vascular smooth muscles. In turn, this led to his extensive research on the subject. Ignarro's research demonstrated that nitric oxide serves the functions of vasorelaxant and inhibitor of platelet aggregation, with both effects mediated by cyclic GMP.

Ignarro continued his research at Tulane. In 1984 he realized that the properties of nitric oxide were the same as those seen in the endothelium derived relaxing factor (EDRF) previously identified by Robert Furchgott three years earlier. The exact nature of the EDRF was up to this point unknown. Furchgott and Ignarro came to similar conclusions about nitric oxide as the EDRF around the same time, but it was Ignarro who presented hard experimental evidence in support of this notion at conferences during 1986 demonstrating that EDRF is nitric oxide.

During the decades since Ignarro and Furchgott's initial research, thousands of studies have been published about the effects of nitric oxide as the endothelium derived relaxing factor. This has led to the development of erectile dysfunction drugs such as Viagra and nutritional supplements designed for cardiovascular health and athletic performance.

In 1985, Ignarro moved from New Orleans to Los Angeles where he accepted a position at the UCLA School of Medicine and continues to research and teach.

== Herbalife relationship ==
Ignarro has worked as a consultant for Herbalife since 2003 and later became a member of the company's Scientific Advisory Board. He has collaborated in developing nutritional supplements for cardiovascular health and athletic performance. Ignarro first worked with Herbalife to develop Niteworks, a dietary supplement designed to boost the body's own production of nitric oxide. Ignarro endorsed this product in exchange for a royalty agreement reported to have earned his consulting firm over $1 million in the first 12 months. Ignarro has continued to work with Herbalife to develop additional supplements focusing on nutrients such as Omega-3 fatty acid and CoQ10. As of 2012, Herbalife has made payments to Ignarro and his affiliated consulting firm of over $15 million.

Ignarro appears in videos promoting Niteworks and other Herbalife products, and is a frequent speaker at Herbalife events. Since partnering with Herbalife, Ignarro has spoken to more than five million people worldwide about nitric oxide and cardiovascular health.

== Famous quotes ==
While testifying before Congress in 2000, Ignarro remarked: "Only in America could the son of an uneducated carpenter receive the Nobel Prize in Medicine".

== Awards and recognitions ==
- Pharmaceutical Manufacturers Association Foundation Research Award. 1973
- Merck Research Award. 1974
- Edward G Schlieder Foundation Award. 1973–1976
- U.S.P.H.S. Career Development Award. 1975 – 1980
- Arthritis Foundation Research Award. 1975 – 1977
- First recipient of the George Clark Memorial Arthritis Fund. 1975
- First recipient of the James Woodrow Waggoner Arthritis Fund. 1976
- Lilly Research Award. 1978
- Tulane Medical School – Outstanding Teacher Award. 1983
- UCLA School of Medicine – Outstanding Teacher Award. 1986
- AMSA Golden Apple Award (for teaching) – UCLA School of Medicine. 1987, 1988, 1989, 1990, 1991, 1992, 1993, 1994, 1995, 1996, 1997, 1999
- Alpha Omega Alpha – Honorary Member. 1990
- UCLA School of Medicine Award for Excellence in Education. 1993
- Roussel Uclaf Prize for Cell Communication and Signaling. Shared with Dr. Salvador Moncada and Dr. Robert Furchgott. 1994
- Wellcome Visiting Professor – Marshall University School of Medicine. 1995
- CIBA Award for Hypertension Research for Discovery of the Roles of Nitric Oxide and Cyclic GMP in Vascular Function. Shared with Dr. Salvador Moncada. 1995
- Basic Research Prize of the American Heart Association in recognition of outstanding contributions to the advancement of cardiovascular science. 1998
- Nobel Prize in Physiology or Medicine for "nitric oxide as a signaling molecule in the cardiovascular system". Shared with Robert Furchgott and Ferid Murad. 1998
- National Academy of Sciences. 1999
- American Academy of Arts and Sciences. 1999
- Institute of Medicine. 2011
- American Philosophical Society. 2007
- Canadian Medal of Merit. 2008
- American Heart Association Distinguished Scientist. 2008
- Honorary doctorates from the Universities of Madrid, Lund, Gent, North Carolina; Naples Federico II
- Golden Plate Award of the American Academy of Achievement. 2014

== Society memberships ==
- American Society for Pharmacology and Experimental Therapeutics
- American Society for Biochemistry and Molecular Biology
- American Physiological Society
- American Society for Cell Biology
- American Rheumatism Association
- American Society of Hematology
- Society for Experimental Biology and Medicine
- American Heart Association
- Italy-USA Foundation

== Book publications ==
- NO More Heart Disease: How Nitric Oxide Can Prevent – Even Reverse – Heart Disease and Strokes. New York: St. Martin's Press (2005). ISBN 0-312-33582-2.
- Nitric Oxide: Biology and Pathobiology. Academic Press (2009). ISBN 0-12-373866-0.
- Health Is Wealth: 10 Power Nutrients That Increase Your Odds Of Living To 100. Health Value Publications (2009). ISBN 0-9790229-1-6.
- Health Is Wealth: Performance Nutrition. Health Value Publications (2011). ISBN 978-1-61389-002-8.
- Survival of the Firmest: UCLA Doctors Describe Ten Steps to Better Erections, a Longer Life and Reversing Erectile Dysfunction (ED). CreateSpace (2011). ISBN 1-4611-5083-3.
- Dr. NO: The Discovery That Led to a Nobel Prize and Viagra.Vertel Publishing (2022). ISBN 1641120290.

== Important publications ==
- 1979 CA Gruetter, BK Barry, DB McNamara, DY Gruetter, PJ Kadowitz and LJ Ignarro. Relaxation of bovine coronary artery and activation of coronary arterial guanylate cyclase by nitric oxide, nitroprusside and a carcinogenic nitrosoamine. J. Cyclic Nucl. Res. 5: 211–224.
- 1980 LJ Ignarro and CA Gruetter. Requirement of thiols for activation of coronary arterial guanylate cyclase by glyceryl trinitrate and sodium nitrite: Possible involvement of S-nitrosothiols. Biochim. Biophys. Acta 631: 221–231.
- 1981 BT Mellion, LJ Ignarro, EH Ohlstein, EG Pontecorvo, AL Hyman and PJ Kadowitz. Evidence for the inhibitory role of guanosine 3',5'-monophosphate in ADP-induced human platelet aggregation. Blood 57: 946–955.
- 1981 LJ Ignarro, H Lippton, JC Edwards, WH Baricos, AL Hyman, PJ Kadowitz and CA Gruetter. Mechanism of vascular smooth muscle relaxation by organic nitrates, nitrites, nitroprusside and nitric oxide: Evidence for the involvement of Snitrosothiols as active intermediates. J. Pharmacol. Exp. Ther. 218: 739–749.
- 1982 MS Wolin, KS Wood and LJ Ignarro. Guanylate cyclase from bovine lung: a kinetic analysis of the regulation of the purified soluble enzyme by protoporphyrin IX, heme and nitrosyl-heme. J. Biol. Chem. 257: 13312-13320.
- 1984 LJ Ignarro, B Ballot and KS Wood. Regulation of guanylate cyclase activity by porphyrins and metalloporphyrins. J. Biol. Chem. 259: 6201–6207.
- 1986 LJ Ignarro, RG Harbison, KS Wood and PJ Kadowitz. Activation of purified soluble guanylate cyclase by endothelium-derived relaxing factor from intrapulmonary artery and vein: stimulation by acetylcholine, bradykinin and arachidonic acid. J. Pharmacol. Exp. Ther. 237: 893–900.
- 1987 LJ Ignarro, RE Byrns, GM Buga and KS Wood. Endothelium-derived relaxing factor from pulmonary artery and vein possesses pharmacological and chemical properties that are identical to those for nitric oxide radical. Circ. Res. 61: 866–879.
- 1987 LJ Ignarro, GM Buga, KS Wood, RE Byrns and G Chaudhuri. Endothelium-derived relaxing factor produced and released from artery and vein is nitric oxide. Proc. Natl. Acad. Sci. USA 84: 9265–9269.
- 1990 LJ Ignarro, PA Bush, GM Buga, KS Wood, JM Fukuto and J Rajfer. Nitric oxide and cyclic GMP formation upon electrical field stimulation cause relaxation of corpus cavernosum smooth muscle. Biochem. Biophys. Res. Commun. 170: 843–850.
- 1992 J Rajfer, WJ Aronson, PA Bush, FJ Dorey and LJ Ignarro. Nitric oxide as a mediator of relaxation of the corpus cavernosum in response to nonadrenergic, noncholinergic neurotransmission. N. Engl. J. Med. 326: 90–94.
- 1994 JM Griscavage, JM Fukuto, Y Komori and LJ Ignarro. Nitric oxide inhibits neuronal nitric oxide synthase by interacting with the heme prosthetic group: role of tetrahydrobiopterin in modulating the inhibitory action of nitric oxide. J. Biol. Chem. 269: 21644-21649.
- 1994 AJ Hobbs, JM Fukuto and LJ Ignarro. Formation of free nitric oxide from Larginine by nitric oxide synthase: direct enhancement of generation by superoxide dismutase. Proc. Natl. Acad. Sci. USA 91: 10992-10996.
- 1996 JM Griscavage, S Wilk and LJ Ignarro. Inhibitors of the proteasome pathway interfere with induction of nitric oxide synthase in macrophages by blocking activation of nuclear factor-kappa B. Proc. Natl. Acad. Sci. USA 93:3308–3312.
- 1999 HC Champion, TJ Bivalacqua, AL Hyman, LJ Ignarro, WJG Hellstrom and PJ Kadowitz. Gene transfer of endothelial nitric oxide synthase to the penis augments erectile responses in the aged rat. Proc. Natl. Acad. Sci. USA 96:11648-11652.
- 2001 LJ Ignarro, GM Buga, LH Wei, PM Bauer, G Wu and P del Soldato. Role of the arginine-nitric oxide pathway in the regulation of vascular smooth muscle cell proliferation. Proc. Natl. Acad. Sci. USA 98: 4202–4208.
- 2001 PM Bauer, GM Buga, JM Fukuto, AE Pegg and LJ Ignarro. Nitric oxide inhibits ornithine decarboxylase via S-nitrosylation of cysteine 360 in the active site of the enzyme. J. Biol. Chem. 276: 34458-34464.
- 2001 PM Bauer, GM Buga and LJ Ignarro. Role of p42/p44 mitogen-activated protein kinase and p21waf1/cip1 in the regulation of vascular smooth muscle cell proliferation by nitric oxide. Proc. Natl. Acad. Sci. USA 98: 12802-12807.
- 2003 F de Nigris, LO Lerman, SW Ignarro, G Sica, A Lerman, W Palinski, LJ Ignarro and C Napoli. Beneficial effects of antioxidants and L-arginine on oxidation-sensitive gene expression and endothelial NO synthase activity at sites of disturbed shear stress. Proc. Natl. Acad. Sci. USA 100:1420–1425.
- 2003 D Sumi and LJ Ignarro. Estrogen-related receptor alpha 1 up-regulates endothelial nitric oxide synthase expression. Proc. Natl. Acad. Sci. USA 100:14451-14456.
- 2004 T Hayashi, D Sumi, PA Juliet, H Matsui-Hirai, Y Asai-Tanaka, H Kano, A Fukatsu, T Tsunekawa, A Miyazaki, A Iguchi and LJ Ignarro. Gene transfer of endothelial NO synthase, but not eNOS plus inducible NOS, regressed atherosclerosis in rabbits. Cardiovasc. Res. 61:339–351.
- 2004 C Napoli, SW Ignarro, F de Nigris, LO Lerman, L Rossi, C Guarino, G Mansueto, F Di Tuoro, O Pignalosa, G De Rosa, V Sica and LJ Ignarro. Long-term combined beneficial effects of physical training and metabolic treatment on atherosclerosis in hypercholesterolemic mice. Proc. Natl. Acad. Sci. USA 101:8797–8802.
- 2005 HJ Garban, D Marquez-Garban, R Pietras and LJ Ignarro. Rapid nitric oxidemediated S-nitrosylation of estrogen receptor: Regulation of estrogen-dependent gene transcription. Proc. Natl. Acad. Sci. USA 102:2632–2636.

== See also ==
- Arginine
- Nitric Oxide
- Pharmacology
- Pharmacy
