= Ferid Murad =

American physician and pharmacologist (1936–2023)

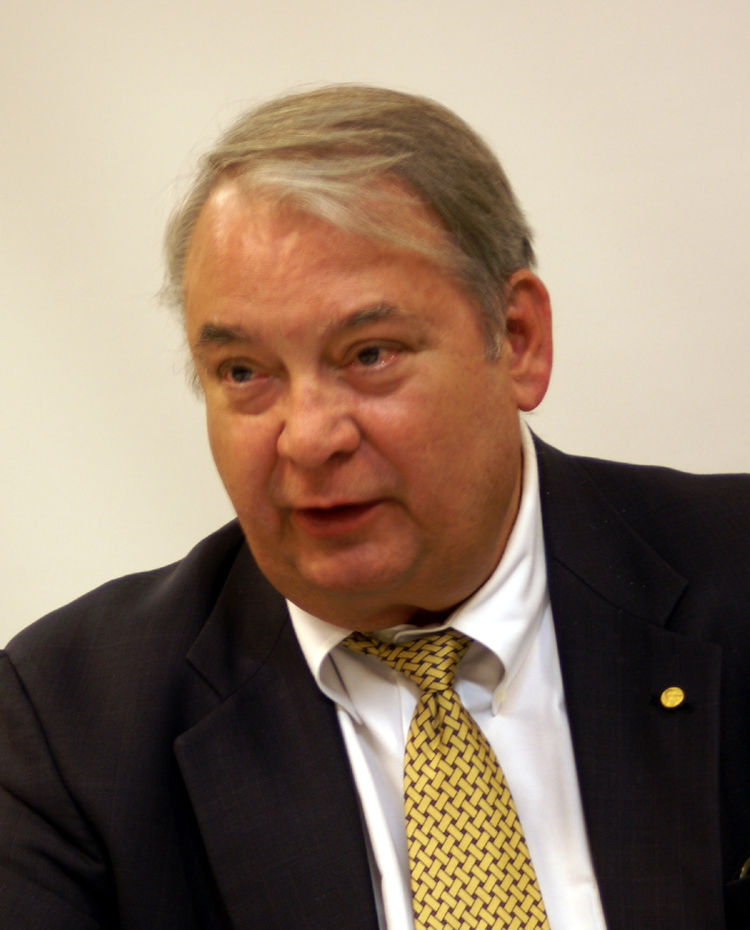
- Murad at a lecture in 2008
- Born: September 14, 1936; Whiting, Indiana, U.S.
- Died: September 4, 2023 (aged 86); Menlo Park, California, U.S.
- Education: DePauw University (BS); Case Western Reserve University (MD, PhD)
- Known for: Discoveries concerning cyclic GMP as a signaling molecule in the cardiovascular system
- Spouse: Carol A. Leopold
- Children: 5
- Awards: Nobel Prize in Physiology or Medicine (1998) and the Albert Lasker Award for Basic Medical Research (1996)
- Scientific career
- Fields: Biochemistry, Pharmacology
- Workplaces: University of Virginia (1970–81), Stanford University (1981–88), Northwestern University (1988–1998), Abbott Laboratories (1988–93), McGovern Medical School (1997–2011), George Washington University (2011–2017), Palo Alto VA Medical Center (2017–2023)
- Doctoral advisor: Earl Sutherland, Jr. and Theodore Rall

Ferid Murad (September 14, 1936 – September 4, 2023) was an American physician and pharmacologist, His research demonstrated that nitroglycerin relaxes smooth muscle by releasing nitric oxide into the body. This work led to him sharing the 1998 Nobel Prize in Physiology or Medicine.

== Early life ==
Ferid Murad was born in Whiting, Indiana, on September 14, 1936. His parents were Henrietta Josephine Bowman of Alton, Illinois, and Xhabir Murat Ejupi, an Albanian immigrant from Gostivar in present-day North Macedonia, who subsequently changed his name to John Murad after being processed at Ellis Island in 1913. His mother was from a Baptist family and ran away from home in 1935, aged 17, to marry his father, who was 39 and Muslim. Murad is the oldest of three boys. Murad and his brothers were raised as Catholics. He was later baptized an Episcopalian while in college. The family owned a small restaurant while Murad was growing up, and he spent his youth working at the family business.

In the eighth grade, he was asked to write an essay of his top three career choices, which he indicated as physician, teacher and pharmacist (in 1948, clinical pharmacology was not yet a discipline in medicine). He was a board-certified physician and internist doing both basic and clinical research with considerable teaching in medicine, pharmacology and clinical pharmacology and with a PhD in pharmacology.

== Education ==
Murad competed successfully for a Rector Scholarship at DePauw University in Greencastle, Indiana, a liberal arts university on a tuition scholarship. He received his undergraduate degree in chemistry from the pre-med program at DePauw University in 1958. During his senior year of college he began to apply to medical schools when his faculty advisor Forst Fuller, a professor in the biology department suggested that he consider a new MD-PhD program at Case Western Reserve University. A fraternity brother, Bill Sutherland, also advised that he consider this new combined degree program that his father Earl Sutherland, Jr initiated in Cleveland in 1957. The program paid full tuition for both degrees and provided a modest stipend of $2,000 per year. Murad ultimately decided to attend and became an early graduate of the first explicit MD and pharmacology Ph.D. program (which would later lead to the development of the prestigious Medical Scientist Training Program) obtaining his degrees from Case Western Reserve University in 1965. He was an Intern in Internal Medicine at Massachusetts General Hospital (1965–66), Resident in Internal Medicine (1966–67), Clinical Associate and Senior Assistant Surgeon, Public Health Service, National Heart and Lung Institute (1967–69) and Senior Staff Fellow there from 1969 to 1970.

== Career ==
Murad began his academic career by joining the University of Virginia, where he was made associate professor, Depts. of Internal Medicine and Pharmacology, School of Medicine in 1970, before becoming a full professor in 1975. From 1971 to 1981 he was Director, Clinical Research Center, UVA School of Medicine and Director, Division of Clinical Pharmacology, Dept. of Internal Medicine, UVA School of Medicine (1973–81). Murad moved to Stanford University in 1981 where he was Chief of Medicine at the Palo Alto VA Medical Center (1981–86), Associate Chairman, Dept. of Medicine, Stanford University (1984–86), and Acting Chairman, Dept. of Medicine and Acting Division Chief, Division of Respiratory Medicine from 1986 to 1988. In 1988 he was the American Heart Association, Ciba Award Recipient. Murad left his tenure at Stanford in 1988 for a position at Abbott Laboratories, where he served as a Vice President of Pharmaceutical Discovery until founding his own biotechnology company, the Molecular Geriatrics Corporation, in 1993. Murad went back to academics and joined the McGovern Medical School to create a new department of integrative biology, pharmacology, and physiology in 1997. There, he was the chairman of Integrative Biology and Pharmacology, professor and director emeritus of The Brown Foundation Institute of Molecular Medicine for the Prevention of Human Disease, John S. Dunn Distinguished Chair in Physiology and Medicine, deputy director of The Brown Foundation Institute of Molecular Medicine, and later a professor at the Brown Foundation Institute of Molecular Medicine. In April 2011, he moved to the George Washington University as a professor in the Department of Biochemistry and Molecular Biology.

Murad's key research demonstrated that nitroglycerin and related drugs worked by releasing nitric oxide into the body, which relaxed smooth muscle by elevating intracellular cyclic GMP. The missing steps in the signaling process were filled in by Robert F. Furchgott and Louis J. Ignarro of UCLA, for which the three shared the 1998 Nobel Prize (and for which Murad and Furchgott received the Albert Lasker Award for Basic Medical Research in 1996). In 1999, Murad and Furchgott received the Golden Plate Award of the American Academy of Achievement. He was also a member of the National Academy of Sciences among other notable societies.

In 2015, Murad signed the Mainau Declaration 2015 on Climate Change on the final day of the 65th Lindau Nobel Laureate Meeting. The declaration was signed by a total of 76 Nobel Laureates and handed to then-President of the French Republic, François Hollande, as part of the successful COP21 climate summit in Paris.

Murad was editing a book series published by Bentham Science Publishers titled Herbal medicine: Back to the Future; two volumes of which have already been published and a third volume was in preparation.

== Death ==
Ferid Murad died in Menlo Park, California, on September 4, 2023, at the age of 86.

== Awards and recognitions ==
- Albert Lasker Award for Basic Medical Research
- American Academy of Achievement
- American Heart Association, Ciba Award
- National Academy of Sciences
- Nobel Prize

== See also ==
- List of Case Western people
