= Zien =

Zien is a surname. Notable people with the surname include:

- Chip Zien (born 1947), American actor
- David Zien (born 1950), American politician
- Maciej Zien (born 1979), Polish fashion designer
- Sam Zien, Canadian-born cook, YouTube personality, author, and restaurateur

== See also ==
- Zinn
