= Dorsa Burnet =

Wrinkle ridge system on the Moon

Coordinates: 28.4°N 57.0°W

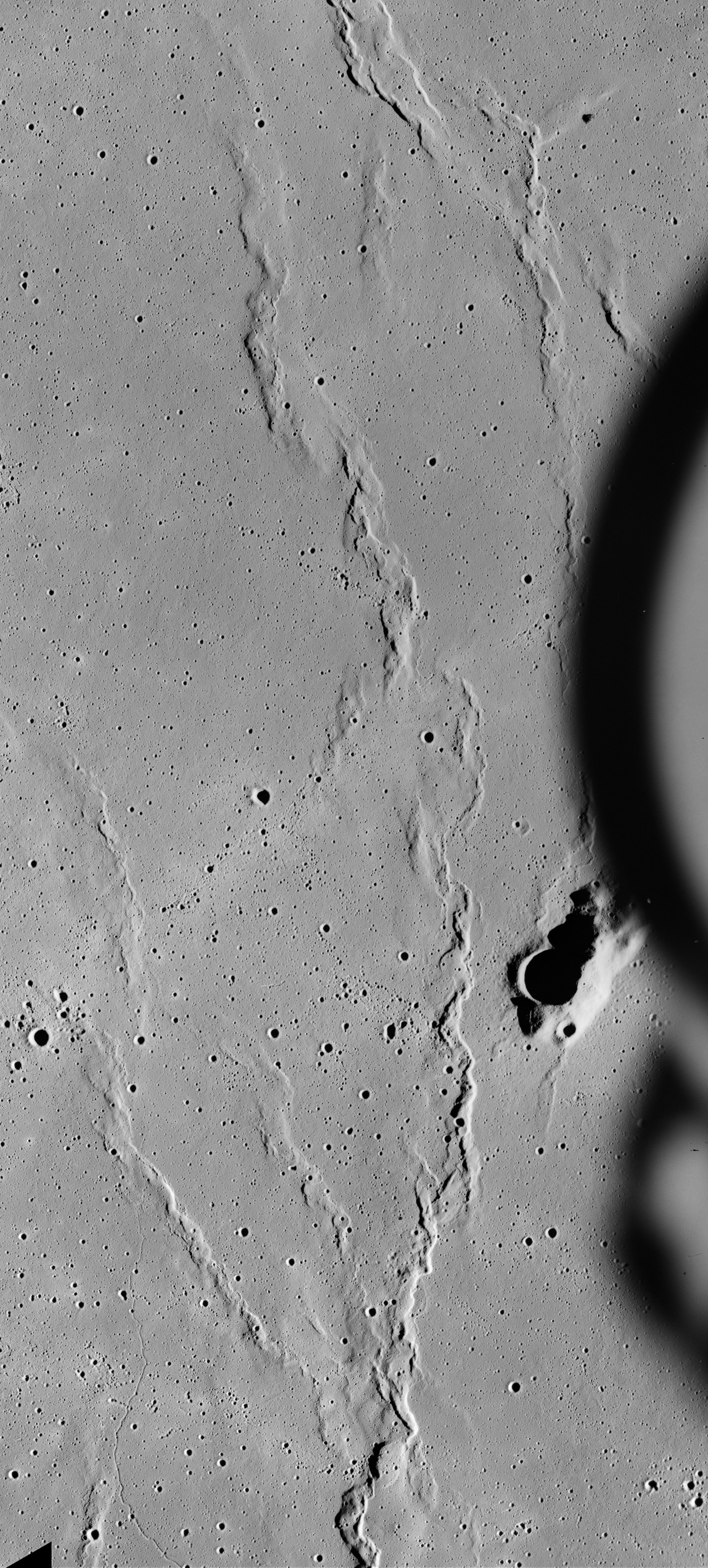
Part of the Dorsa Burnet, from Apollo 15. The Dorsa extend to the south out of the photo. The blurry object at right is part of the Apollo 15 Command Module Endeavour.

Dorsa Burnet are wrinkle ridges in Oceanus Procellarum on the Moon. They are about 194 km long and were named after Thomas Burnet by the IAU in 1976.

The dorsa draw near the southwest end of the Montes Agricola, and curve around the western Aristarchus plateau. The craters Schiaparelli, Golgi, and Zinner lie to the west.
