= Zinner (crater) =

Crater on the Moon

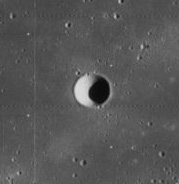
- Lunar Orbiter 4 image
- Coordinates: 26.6°N 58.8°W
- Diameter: 4 km
- Depth: Unknown
- Colongitude: 59° at sunrise
- Eponym: Ernst Zinner

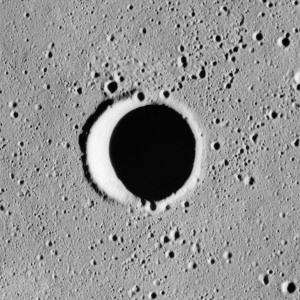
Apollo 15 image

Zinner is a tiny lunar impact crater located due north of the crater Schiaparelli on the Oceanus Procellarum. It is circular and cup-shaped, with a high albedo in comparison to the surrounding lunar mare. The crater has essentially no rim because the mare lava nearly flooded it. A ray from the crater Glushko crosses Zinner. To the northwest is the slightly larger crater Golgi. East of Zinner is the Dorsa Burnet wrinkle ridge system.

This feature was previously designated Schiaparelli B before being given a name by the IAU.
