= Zinner =

Zinner is a surname. Notable people with the surname include:

- Emil Zinner (1909–1942), Jewish-Czech chess master
- Ernst Zinner (1886–1970), German astronomer
- Ernst K. Zinner (1937–2015), Austrian astrophysicist
- Hedda Zinner (1905–1994), German political writer
- Nick Zinner (born 1974), American guitarist
- Peter Zinner (1919–2007), American filmmaker

== See also ==
- Zinner (crater), a lunar crater
