= YurView California =

Cable TV channel in San Diego

- Country: United States
- Broadcast area: San Diego; Imperial County; Coachella Valley; Yuma County
- Headquarters: San Diego, California

Programming
- Language: English
- Picture format: 1080i (HDTV); 480i (SDTV)

Ownership
- Owner: Cox Communications

History
- Replaced: San Diego Cable Sports Network
- Former names: KCOX (1981–1997); Channel 4 San Diego/4SD (1997–2017)

Links
- Website: www.yurview.com/california/

YurView California (formerly known as 4SD, Channel 4 San Diego or unofficially COX 4, and originally known as KCOX) is an American cable television channel serving San Diego, California, owned by Cox Communications, which carries the channel primarily on its San Diego area systems on channel 4.

It originally operated as a regional sports network for San Diego County, with a mixed format resembling that of Denver-based regional sports network Altitude Sports and Entertainment. After the loss of the network's television rights to many professional and collegiate sports teams in recent years, its programming has shifted more towards public interest programs as well as local programming, informercials and older television series that the channel had been carrying before losing the majority of its sports programming.

== History ==
Cox Communications originally launched the channel sometime in the early 1980s as KCOX. Initially, a large portion of the programming on KCOX was sourced from the USA Network. Beginning January 1, 1983, Cox began offering both USA and KCOX as 24-hour services.

In 1996, the outlet was developed as an experimental service intended to cover the 1996 Republican National Convention (which was held at the San Diego Convention Center), as well as to provide round-the-clock coverage for the Super Bowl festivities at Qualcomm Stadium in 1998 and 2003.

Former logo as 4SD, used from 1996 to 2017.

During the October 2007 wildfires that affected San Diego, 4SD carried ABC programs, including the network's news and primetime shows, in lieu of the market's ABC affiliate KGTV (channel 10) due to that station's breaking news coverage of the fires. Similarly on January 17, 2010, 4SD aired a college basketball game between the Connecticut Huskies and the Michigan Wolverines in place of CBS affiliate KFMB-TV (channel 8), which instead carried a local pregame show for the divisional playoff game between the New York Jets and the San Diego Chargers.

Since 2012, 4SD has served as an alternate channel for Fox Sports San Diego for Cox and Time Warner Cable systems in San Diego County, carrying games from other teams that the regional sports network holds television rights in the event that live Padres telecasts on Fox Sports San Diego occur simultaneously as Los Angeles Clippers, Anaheim Ducks or Los Angeles Kings broadcast (which are simulcast from the latter channel's Los Angeles-based sister network Fox Sports Prime Ticket).

Cox San Diego agreed to carry some games from the first season of the Fall Experimental Football League in October and November 2014. The channel was only programmed part-time

In March 2017, Cox Communications rebranded its local origination channels under the YurView banner (with The Cox Channel relaunching as YurView California), as part of a nationwide effort by Cox to bring all of their community access channels under a unified brand.

== Programming ==
YurView California now serves as a locally originated entertainment channel, with many of its programs airing several times each week. Shows broadcast on the channel include Sam the Cooking Guy, BackBeat (a program about local musicians), California Life with Heather Dawson, Forefront and Cox California Edition. YurView also airs live sports events, including high school football and basketball, some general sports interview programs (including Raceline and The Tim McCarver Show), as well as the Padres since May 31, 2023 due to the shutdown of Bally Sports San Diego.

=== Sports programming ===
==== San Diego Padres ====
In 1997, 4SD obtained partial broadcast rights to Major League Baseball games from the San Diego Padres; it aired the team's Monday through Saturday games, with Sunday games (which were produced by 4SD) being televised on independent station KUSI (channel 51). In 2001, the Padres and Cox Communications signed a 10-year extension for broadcast rights; as a result of the deal, 4SD built a state-of-the-art broadcast center located at Petco Park. KUSI lost rights to the Padres following the 2003 season, after having aired the team's games for most of the previous 17 seasons; beginning with the 2004 season, 4SD became the Padres' exclusive broadcaster of games that are not nationally televised (on ESPN, ESPN2, MLB Network or Fox); although games that are not aired on 4SD or any of Major League Baseball's national partners are not televised within the Padres designated market area.

The majority of these non-televised games are usually mid-week daytime games, which air in time periods more subject to lower viewership. However beginning in August 2010, the Padres in conjunction with MLB Advanced Media partnered to stream the non-televised games for free within the Padres market via MLB.tv for games that did not fall within the blackout windows imposed by Fox (on Saturday afternoon) or ESPN (on Sunday nights). During the time that 4SD held the Padres broadcast rights, Cox Communications' Las Vegas system simulcast Padres games on Cox 96 which broadcast the team's games exclusively in standard definition (the channel otherwise carries Las Vegas area government affairs and special event programming).

On April 21, 2011, 4SD manager Dennis Morgigno announced during a meeting with his employees that 4SD will probably not renew the Padres television rights for the 2012 season onwards. This was later formally acknowledged by Cox Communications' vice president of cable affairs for the San Diego market, Sam Attisha, in an announcement that it would lay off the channel's baseball production staff at the end of the 2011 season. The decision not to renew rights resulted from a dispute during contract negotiations in which 4SD and the Padres differed on an annual payments for the rights to the team's games from 2012 onward by a margin of $6 million a year for the next contract. Fox Sports Net offered the Padres a 20-year contract with rights fees ranging from $17 million to $22 million a year (running between $340 and $440 million by the end of the term) with some reports of up to $70 million a year (amounting to $1.4 billion at the end of the 20-year term). Fox Sports won the contract, resulting in the creation of a new regional sports network to televise the games, Fox Sports San Diego (now Bally Sports San Diego).

On May 31, 2023, the rights to the Padres were transferred to Major League Baseball after Bally Sports' parent company Diamond Sports Group (which had acquired the Fox Sports Networks in 2021) missed a payment to the team under its chapter 11 bankruptcy. The new MLB Local Media division assumed production and distribution rights for the Padres' regional broadcasts, which enters into ad-hoc agreements with individual television providers to distribute games via part-time channels. Cox would initially schedule these games on YurView California, effectively returning the Padres to the channel for the first time since 2011.

==== San Diego Chargers ====
Although YurView California never carried live Charger game telecasts, the channel formerly aired ancillary programming related to the NFL team including interview shows and Chargers game preview programs before their 2017 move to Los Angeles.

==== San Diego State University Aztecs ====
From the channel's 1996 inception until 2006, 4SD carried sports events from the Mountain West Conference, in partnership with regional sports network Sportswest. On September 1, 2006, the Mountain West Conference formed its own sports network, the MountainWest Sports Network (also known as "The Mtn.", which was shut down on June 1, 2012). However, as part of a distribution agreement between Cox Communications and the MountainWest Sports Network, 4SD was allowed to carry select San Diego State Aztecs sporting events that were produced by the MountainWest Sports Network as well as most of the MWC Basketball Tournament (which was produced by The Mtn. and CBS Sports Network), with the exception of the conference championship game (whose rights were held by Versus/NBC Sports Network (now NBCSN). The Mountain West broadcast rights were exclusive to the 4SD feed carried on Cox; the telecasts were not carried on Time Warner Cable as MountainWest Sports Network did not maintain a distribution deal with that provider.

==== University of San Diego Toreros ====
In 1998, 4SD obtained the broadcast rights to USD Toreros basketball home games that are not nationally televised (by either ESPN, ESPN2, ESPNU or Fox Sports Net). In 2008, 4SD partnered with Comcast SportsNet California and Comcast SportsNet Northwest to provide regional coverage of West Coast Conference men's basketball (the deal allows WCC games produced and broadcast by either 4SD or Comcast SportsNet to be carried by either of the three channels, displaying the other network's on-air graphics during the game telecasts on the respective channels). 4SD previously aired all San Diego State University Aztec football/basketball game that was not on ESPN or ESPN2. However, in August 2011, Cox announced that 4SD would not renew its broadcast deal with the university for the 2011-12 basketball season.

==== San Diego Legion ====
In 2018, the channel signed a distribution deal with the San Diego Legion professional rugby union to broadcast eight matches during its inaugural season with Major League Rugby.

==== San Diego Clippers ====
Beginning with 2024–25 NBA G League season, YurView California is the broadcast home for the San Diego Clippers.

== Carriage ==
YurView California is currently only available on Cox cable.

In addition to its carriage on Cox Communications, YurView California (at the time 4SD) was available on San Diego County's other major cable provider, Time Warner Cable (TWC). However it was not available until March 2009 when Time Warner Cable began carrying 4SD on its systems. In June 2010 Time Warner Cable began carrying the channel's high definition feed on its Desert Cities systems. The channel was dropped from TWC lineups sometime in 2016. Games (but not the full lineup) were also made available to Cox subscribers in the Las Vegas Market.

YurView California was never available on satellite providers DirecTV and Dish Network or to IPTV provider AT&T U-verse. This is because YurView is distributed via fiber optic relays and its feed is not uplinked to satellite (similar to the distribution method of Comcast SportsNet Philadelphia). A controversial guideline imposed by the Federal Communications Commission (FCC) as part of the Cable Television Consumer Protection and Competition Act of 1992 (known as the "terrestrial exception"), which was implemented to encourage investments in local programming, stated that a television channel does not have to make its programming available to pay television providers that do not operate as cable services (such as satellite providers) if it does not use satellites for their transmission.

On January 20, 2010, the FCC voted 4–1 to close the terrestrial loophole. The ruling, however, did not dictate a maximum amount that providers were allowed to charge providers to carry microwave- or fiber optic-distributed channels. On June 15, 2010, Cox Communications announced its intentions to negotiate with DirecTV, Dish Network and AT&T U-verse to distribute 4SD to those providers. Reportedly, Cox negotiationed a subscriber fee that is much more than DirecTV, Dish Network or AT&T U-verse were willing to pay. However, these negotiations were not successful and led to the Padres' decision to sign a new deal with Fox.

== YurView California HD ==
YurView California HD (formerly 4SD HD) is a high definition simulcast feed of 4SD, which broadcasts in the 1080i resolution format. It is carried on channel 4 on Cox Communications and Charter Spectrum in San Diego County, and on channel 27 on Charter Spectrum's Desert Cities system.

In 2004, 4SD began simulcasting Padres games in 1080i high definition. Between 2004 and 2006, 4SD broadcast approximately 120 games in high definition (however, road games outside the National League West Division, and interleague matchups outside of AL West teams were broadcast in standard definition, with the exception of a 2004 game featuring the Padres first-ever regular season road games against the Boston Red Sox and the New York Yankees, which were both broadcast in high definition); all Padres game telecasts on 4SD aired in high definition beginning with the 2007 season.
