= Zins =

Zins is a surname. Notable people with the surname include:

- Brian Zins, United States Marine Corps officer
- Lucien Zins (1922–2002), French swimmer
- Voldemārs Žins (1905–?), Latvian footballer

== See also ==
- Zin (disambiguation)
- Zinn
