= Zinn =

Zinn is a German occupational surname, which means someone who works with tin, a tin blacksmith. The name may refer to:

== Surname ==
- A. L. Zinn (c. 1888–1957), American jurist from New Mexico
- Amalia Emma Sophie Zinn (1807–1851) Danish composer and memorist
- Ben Zinn (born 1937), Israeli engineer and football player
- Elfi Zinn (born 1953), German athlete
- Frank Zinn (1885–1936), American baseball player
- Fred Zinn (1892–1960), American aviator and photographer
- Georg August Zinn (1901–1976), German politician
- George Zinn (1842–1899), American general
- Guy Zinn (1887–1949), American baseball player
- Howard Zinn (1922–2010), American historian
- Jean Zinn-Justin (born 1943), French physicist
- Jimmy Zinn (1895–1991), American baseball player
- Johann Gottfried Zinn (1727–1759), German scientist
- Johann Ludvig Zinn (1734–1802), German-Danish merchant
- Jon Kabat-Zinn (born 1944), American physician
- Lothar Zinn (1938–1980), German chess player
- Maxine Baca Zinn (born 1942), American sociologist
- Ray Zinn (born 1937), American businessman
- Ronald Zinn (1939–1965), American athlete
- Russel W. Zinn (born 1951), Canadian judge
- Rusty Zinn (born 1970), American musician
- Stacy Zinn, American politician
- Walter Zinn (1906–2000), Canadian physicist
- William V. Zinn (1903–1989), British civil engineer and Buddhist

== First name ==
- Zinn Beck (1885–1981), American baseball player

== See also ==
- Zin (disambiguation)
- Zinner
- Zinnemann
