= Schiaparelli (lunar crater) =

Circular depression on the Moon

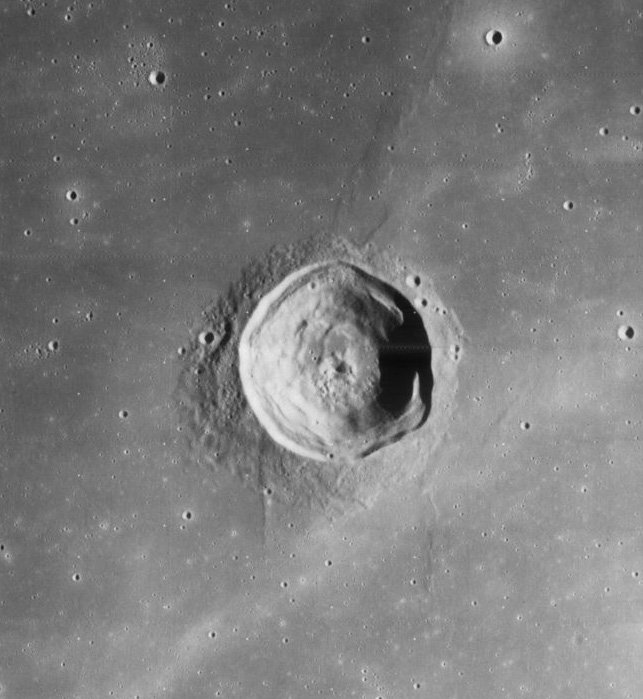
- Lunar Orbiter 4 image
- Coordinates: 23.4°N 58.8°W
- Diameter: 24 km
- Depth: 2.1 km
- Colongitude: 59° at sunrise
- Eponym: Giovanni Schiaparelli

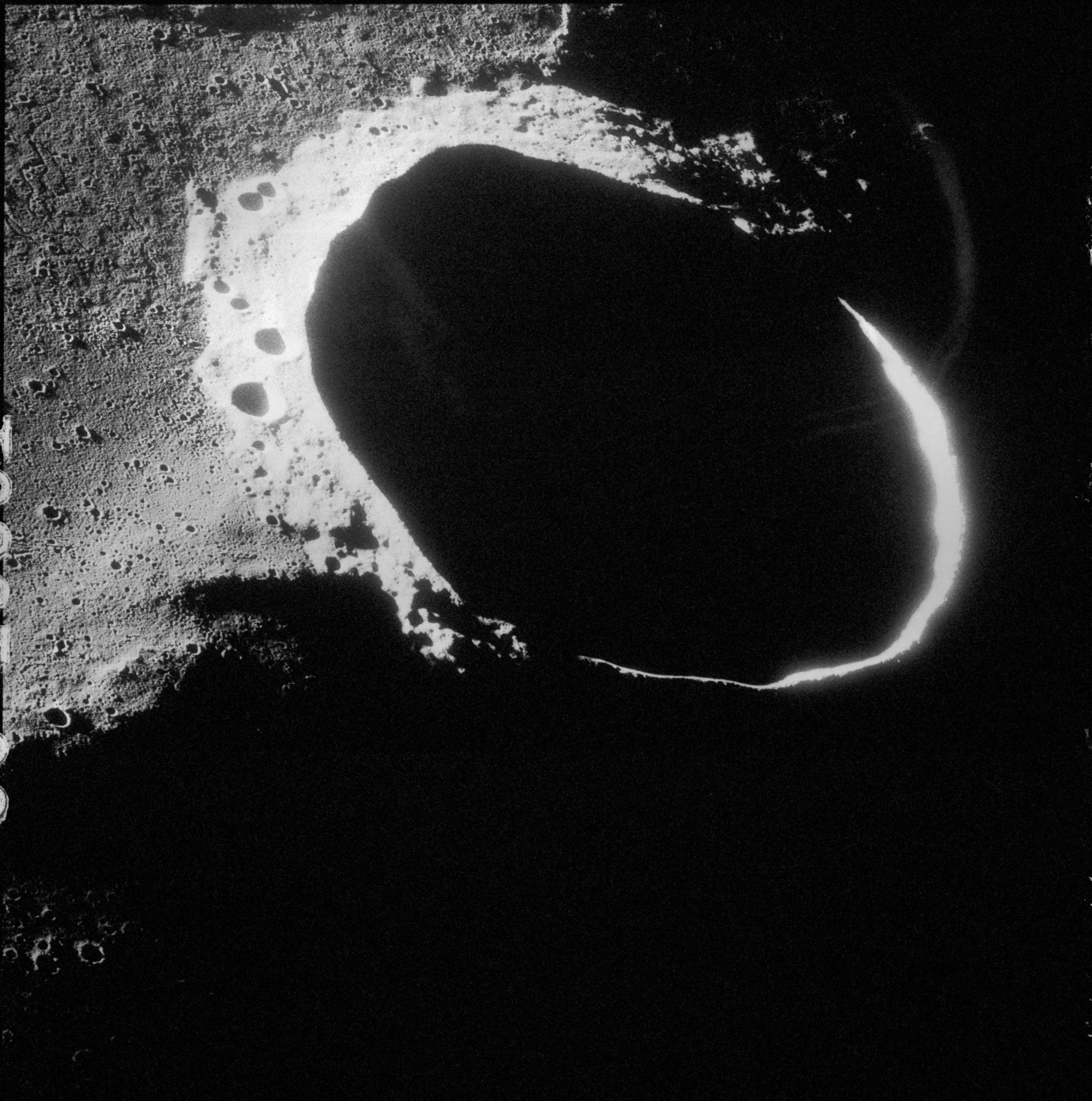
Oblique view of Schiaparelli from Apollo 15 just after sunrise, facing south.

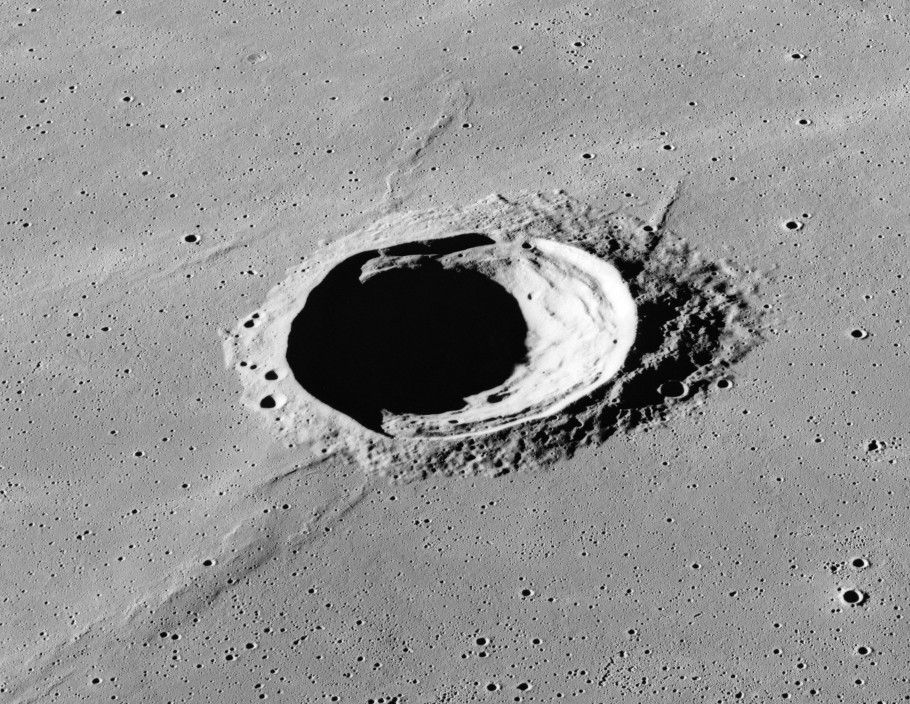
Oblique view of Schiaparelli under a low sun angle later in the Apollo 15 mission. It is clear in this view that the mare material has covered the ejecta of the crater.

Schiaparelli (/ˌskæpəˈrɛli, ˌʃæp-/ SKAP-ə-REL-ee, SHAP-, US also /skiˌɑːp-/ skee-AHP-, Italian: [skjapaˈrɛlli]) is a lunar impact crater located on the western part of the Oceanus Procellarum, to the west of the crater Herodotus. The rim is relatively sharp-edged and relatively free from impact wear. The inner walls have slumped to form a shelf around much of the sides. The interior floor is somewhat irregular, but free from impacts of note.

This crater lies in a relatively flat and featureless part of the mare, although a ray streak from the distant crater Glushko passes along the southeastern edge of the rim, making it easy to identify. A low wrinkle ridge runs from the north rim of the crater to the north. Within the crater is a low central rise.

== Satellite craters ==
By convention these features are identified on lunar maps by placing the letter on the side of the crater midpoint that is closest to Schiaparelli.

Schiaparelli	Latitude	Longitude	Diameter
A	23.0° N	62.0° W	7 km
C	25.8° N	62.2° W	6 km
E	27.1° N	62.0° W	5 km

The following craters have been renamed by the IAU.

- Schiaparelli B — See Zinner (crater).
- Schiaparelli D — See Golgi (crater).

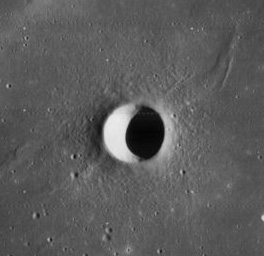
Lunar Orbiter 4 image of Schiaparelli A

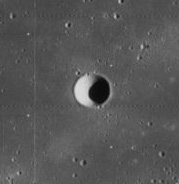
Lunar Orbiter 4 image of Zinner (Schiaparelli B)

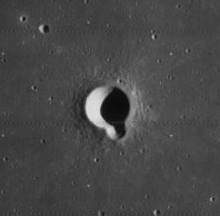
Lunar Orbiter 4 image of Schiaparelli C

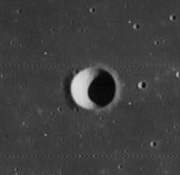
Lunar Orbiter 4 image of Golgi (Schiaparelli D)

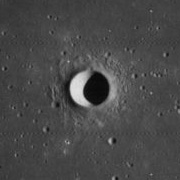
Lunar Orbiter 4 image of Schiaparelli E
