= Dorsum Owen =

Wrinkle ridge on the Moon

Coordinates: 25.0°N 11.0°E

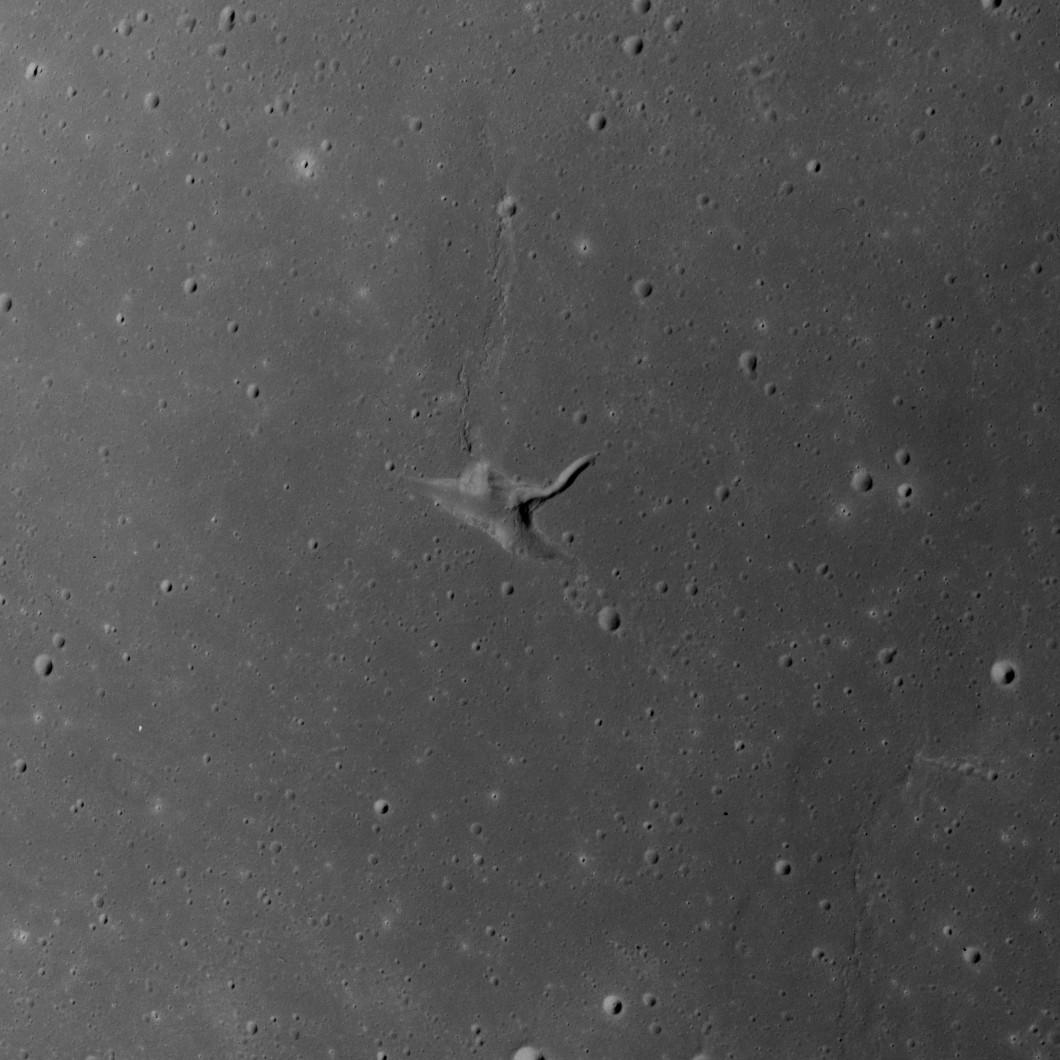
View of Aratus CA and surroundings from Apollo 15. North of the crater is the wrinkle ridge known as Dorsum Owen.

Dorsum Owen is a wrinkle ridge in Mare Serenitatis on the Moon. It is 33 km long and was named after Welsh geologist George Owen of Henllys in 1976.
