= Zin =

Zin or ZIN may refer to:

== Places ==
- Zin, Afghanistan, a town in Afghanistan
- Zin Desert, an area mentioned in the Bible
- Interlaken Airport, Switzerland (by IATA code)

== Other uses ==
- Thet Zin, Burmese journalist
- Zin (vodou) Three-legged cauldron used in kanzo rite
- Zin (water spirits), mythical water spirits of West Africa
- Zinfandel, a variety of red grape commonly used to make wine
- Zin Hizaki, a character from Sky Girls
- Zin (band), a compas band whose lead singer is Alan Cavé
- Zinza language (by ISO 639 code), a Bantu language of Tanzania

== See also ==
- Zyn, maker of nicotine pouches
- Zins, a surname
- Zinn, a surname
