= Ernst Zinner =

German astronomer and historian

- Born: 2 February 1886; Goldberg, Silesia
- Died: 30 August 1970 (aged 84); Planegg, Bavaria
- Education: University of Jena; Ludwig-Maximilians-Universität München
- Known for: History of Astronomy
- Scientific career
- Fields: Astronomy, history of science
- Workplaces: Remeis Observatory

Ernst Zinner (2 February 1886 in Goldberg, Silesia – 30 August 1970) was a German astronomer and noted historian of astronomy. He was a director of the observatory at Bamberg. His major work was on the diffusion of Copernican ideas. During the Third Reich, he refused to become a member of the NSDAP.

== Life and work ==
Zinner was born in Goldberg, Silesia. After school at Johanneum Gymnasium in Liegnitz, he studied astronomy and mathematics at the Ludwig-Maximilians-Universität München and the University of Jena, and obtained his PhD in 1907 at the University of Jena, followed by stays at Lund University working with C. V. L. Charlier, the University of Paris with J. H. Poincaré, and the Königstuhl Observatory in Heidelberg under W. Valentiner. His doctoral work was on using stereoscopic images to examine the positions of celestial bodies. At the Heidelberg observatory he worked on double stars for a star catalogue begun in 1908 by Przybyllok and Völkel. From 1 February 1910, Zinner worked as an assistant to Ernst Hartwig at Remeis Observatory, Bamberg. Here, on 23 October 1913, he rediscovered the Comet Giacobini-Zinner, which had been previously discovered by Michel Giacobini in 1900. His main work during this time was on variable stars. After working as a meteorologist during World War I, Zinner returned to Bamberg, but then moved to Munich to work in geodesy. In 1924, Zinner received the professor's title from the Ludwig-Maximilians-Universität München. He was appointed director of Remeis-Observatory in Bamberg, Germany, in 1926 and retired in 1956. During this time his main astronomical work centered on stellar astronomy. His main speciality and interest, however, was Renaissance Astronomy and the history of astronomical instruments, an area in which he started working in 1925.

In 1943, during the World War II, Zinner published the book Entstehung und Ausbreitung der coppernicanischen Lehre on the genesis and diffusion of the Copernican theory. The book largely promoted German astronomy and tries to connect Copernicus to Germany, noting that his grandfather came from Krakow then a German town. A Nazi letter noted that Zinner was associated with the German National People's Party and that he had not become a member of the NSDAP in 1938. The letter however said that Zinner could not be considered an enemy of the state. Zinner's work included the work of medieval Jewish astronomers in an index, but the text made no mention of astronomers like David Gans although noting briefly that Gans had assisted Tycho Brahe.

His obituaries quote a total of 9000 printed pages on the subject of astronomical history, with the most significant ones focusing on biographies and cataloguing early astronomical works and instruments. In 1967, fearing that the Soviet Union would take it away, he sold nearly 2700 of his books and manuscripts to the San Diego State College and his personal papers to the Frankfurt University which gave him an honorary doctorate in 1961.

== Works ==
- Leben und Wirken des Joh. Müller von Königsberg, genannt Regiomontanus; Translated into English by Ezra A. Brown as "Regiomontanus: His Life and Work"
- Geschichte und Bibliographie der Astronomischen Literatur in Deutschland zur Zeit der Renaissance

== Honors ==
- The crater Zinner on the Moon is named after him.
- Honorary doctorate of the University of Frankfurt
- Honorary citizen of Königsberg in Franken
- Leibniz Medal of the Prussian Academy of Sciences
