= Thomas Burnet (theologian) =

English theologian and writer on cosmogony (1635–1715)

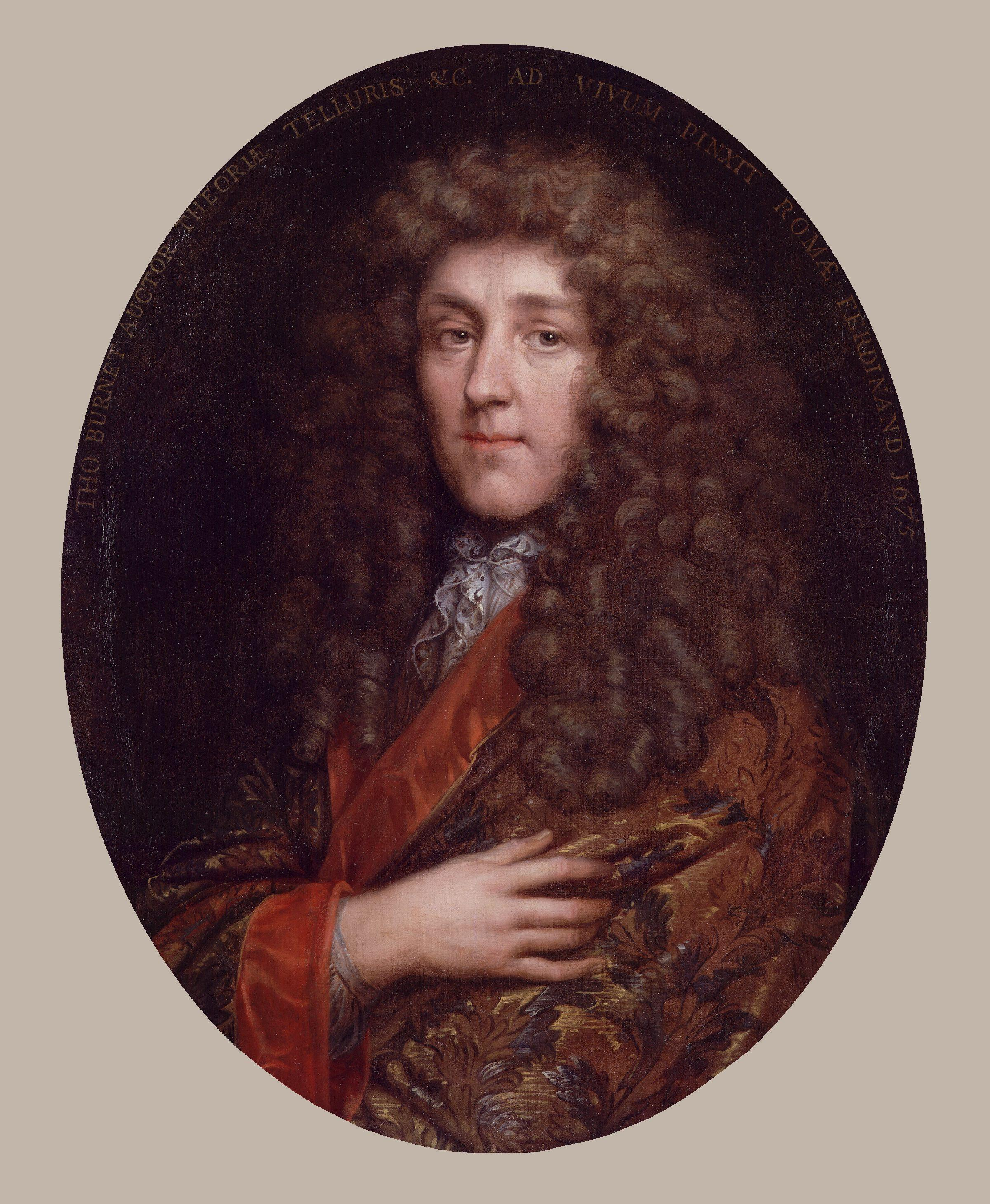
- Thomas Burnet by Jacob Ferdinand Voet
- Born: c. 1635; Croft-on-Tees, Yorkshire, England
- Died: 27 September 1715 (aged c. 80)
- Occupation: theologian

Thomas Burnet (c. 1635? – 27 September 1715) was an English theologian and writer on cosmogony.

== Life ==
He was born at Croft near Darlington in 1635. After studying at Northallerton Grammar School under Thomas Smelt, he went to Clare College, Cambridge in 1651. There he was a pupil of John Tillotson. Ralph Cudworth, the Master of Clare, moved to Christ's College, Cambridge in 1654, and Burnet followed him. He became fellow of Christ's in 1657, M.A. in 1658, and was proctor in 1667.

Burnet took employment travelling with Lord Wiltshire, son of Charles Paulet, 6th Marquess of Winchester, and through Tillotson as tutor to Lord Ossory, grandson of James Butler, 1st Duke of Ormonde. The influence of the Duke of Ormonde, one of the governors, secured his appointment in 1685 to the mastership of Charterhouse . Burnet took part in the resistance offered to James II's attempt to make Andrew Popham a pensioner of the Charterhouse. At two meetings held by the governors 17 January and Midsummer day 1687, the king's letters of dispensation were produced, but, in spite of the efforts of George Jeffreys, a governor, the majority refused compliance.

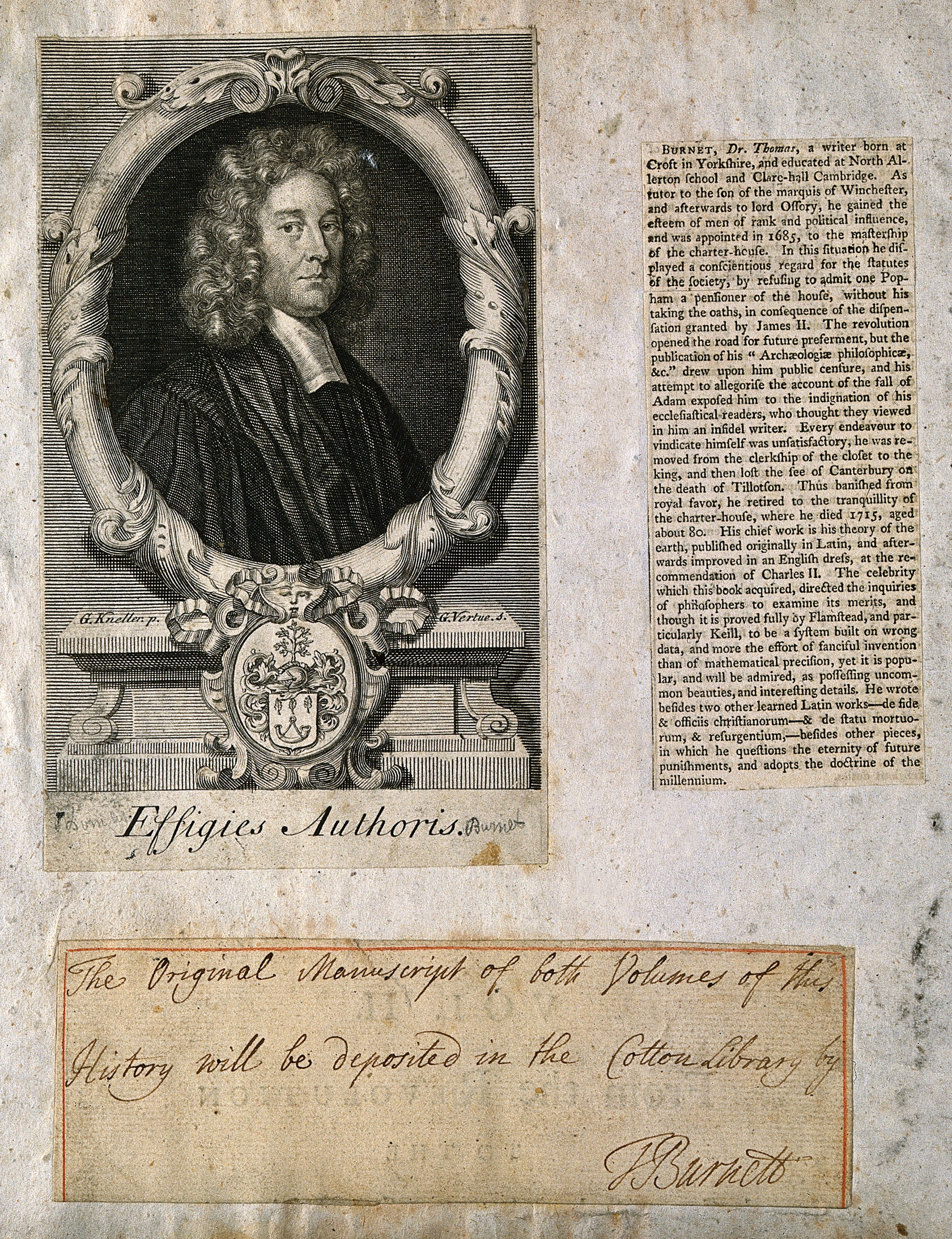
Portrait of Burnet, with handwritten note

After the Glorious Revolution Burnet became chaplain in ordinary and Clerk of the Closet to William III (until 1695). He received no clerical preferment and lived quietly in the Charterhouse, where he died on 27 September 1715, and was buried in the chapel.

== Works ==
=== Sacred Theory of the Earth ===
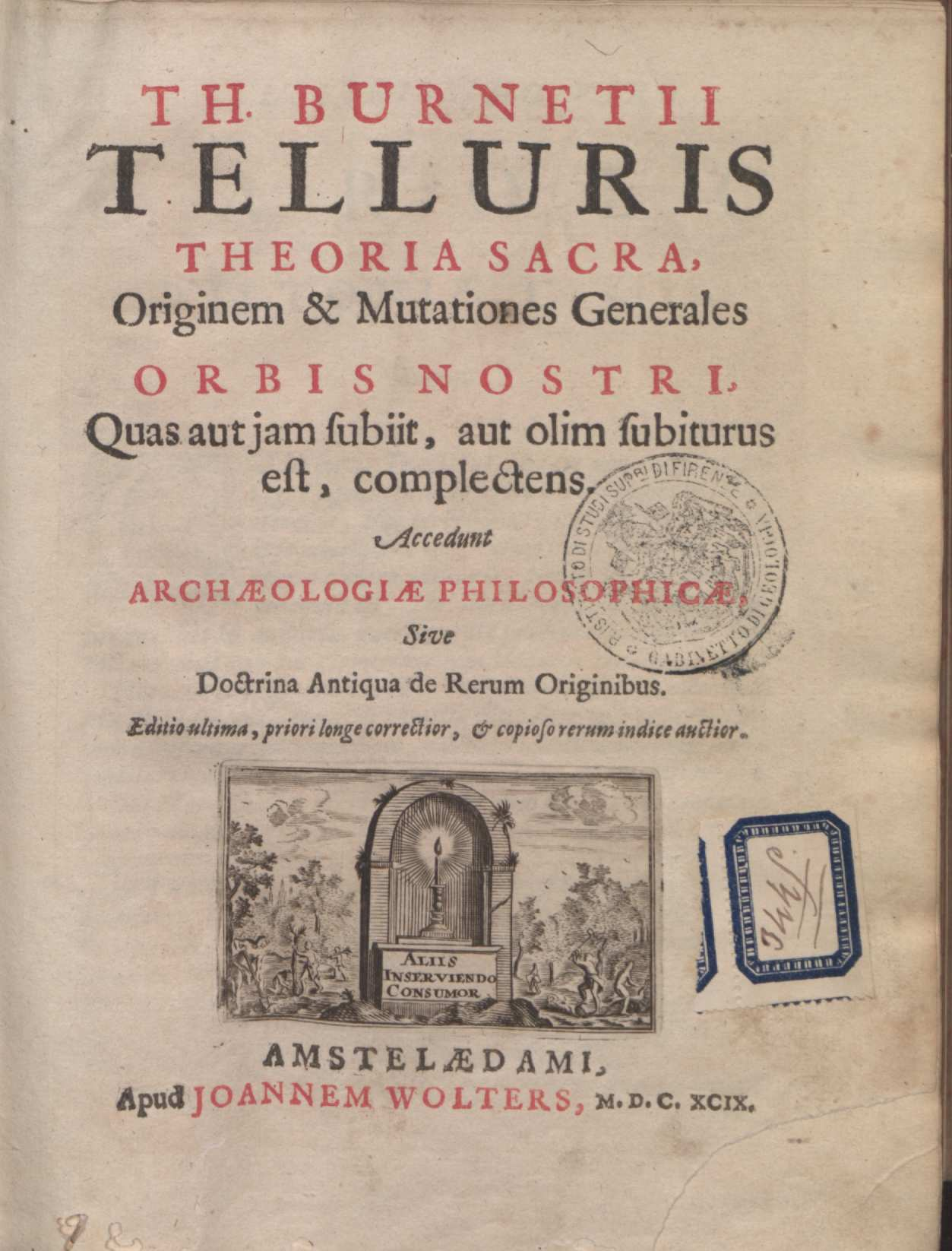
Telluris theoria sacra, 1699 edition

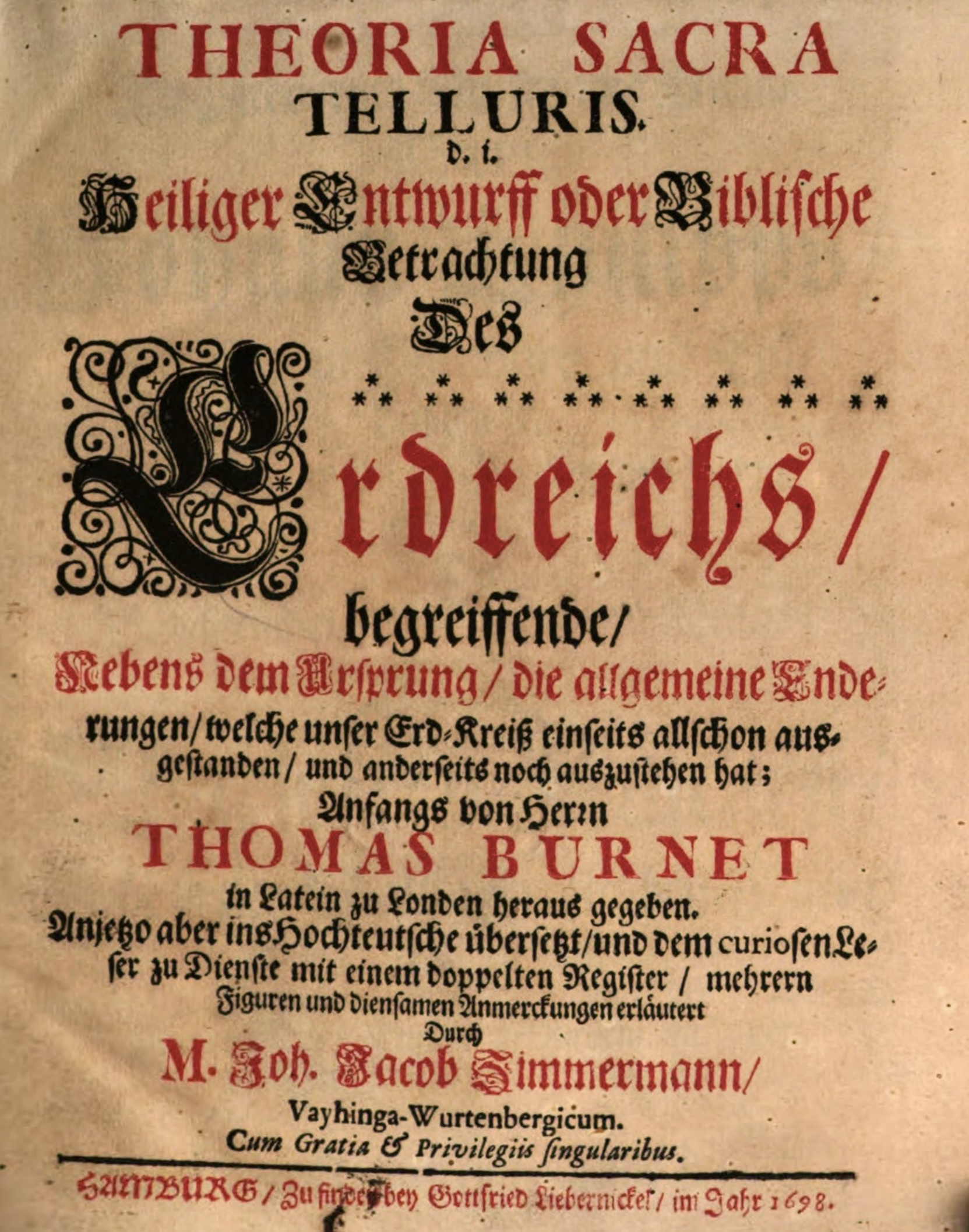
Title page of the German first edition of Telluris Theoria Sacra, 1698

Burnet's best known work is his Telluris Theoria Sacra, or Sacred Theory of the Earth. The first part was published in 1681 in Latin, and in 1684 in English translation; the second part appeared in 1689 (1690 in English). It was a speculative cosmogony, in which Burnet suggested a Hollow Earth with most of the water inside until Noah's Flood, at which time mountains and oceans appeared. He calculated the amount of water on Earth's surface, stating there was not enough to account for the Flood. Burnet was to some extent influenced by Descartes who had written on the creation of the earth in Principia philosophiae (1644), and was criticised on those grounds by Roger North. The heterodox views of Isaac La Peyrère included the idea that the Flood was not universal; Burnet's theory was at least in part intended to answer him on that point.

Burnet's system had its novel features, as well as those such as the four classical elements that were very traditional: an initially ovoid Earth, a Paradise before the Flood that was always in the spring season, and rivers flowing from the poles to the Equator. Herbert Croft published criticism of the book in 1685, in particular accusing Burnet of following the Second Epistle of Peter rather than the Book of Genesis. During the 1690s John Beaumont and Johann Caspar Eisenschmidt picked up on Burnet's ideas. They engendered a great deal of controversy at the time, and Burnet defended himself against selected critics, John Keill and Erasmus Warren.

Isaac Newton was an admirer of Burnet's theological approach to geological processes. Newton even wrote to Burnet, suggesting the possibility that when God created the Earth, the days were longer. However, Burnet did not find this explanation scientific enough. Lengthening the days would require an intervention on God's part. Burnet tightly held the belief that God created the world and all its processes perfectly from the start. He wrote:

We think him a better Artist that makes a Clock that strikes regularly at every hour from the Springs and Wheels which he puts into the work, than he that hath so made his Clock that he must put his finger to it every hour to make it strike.

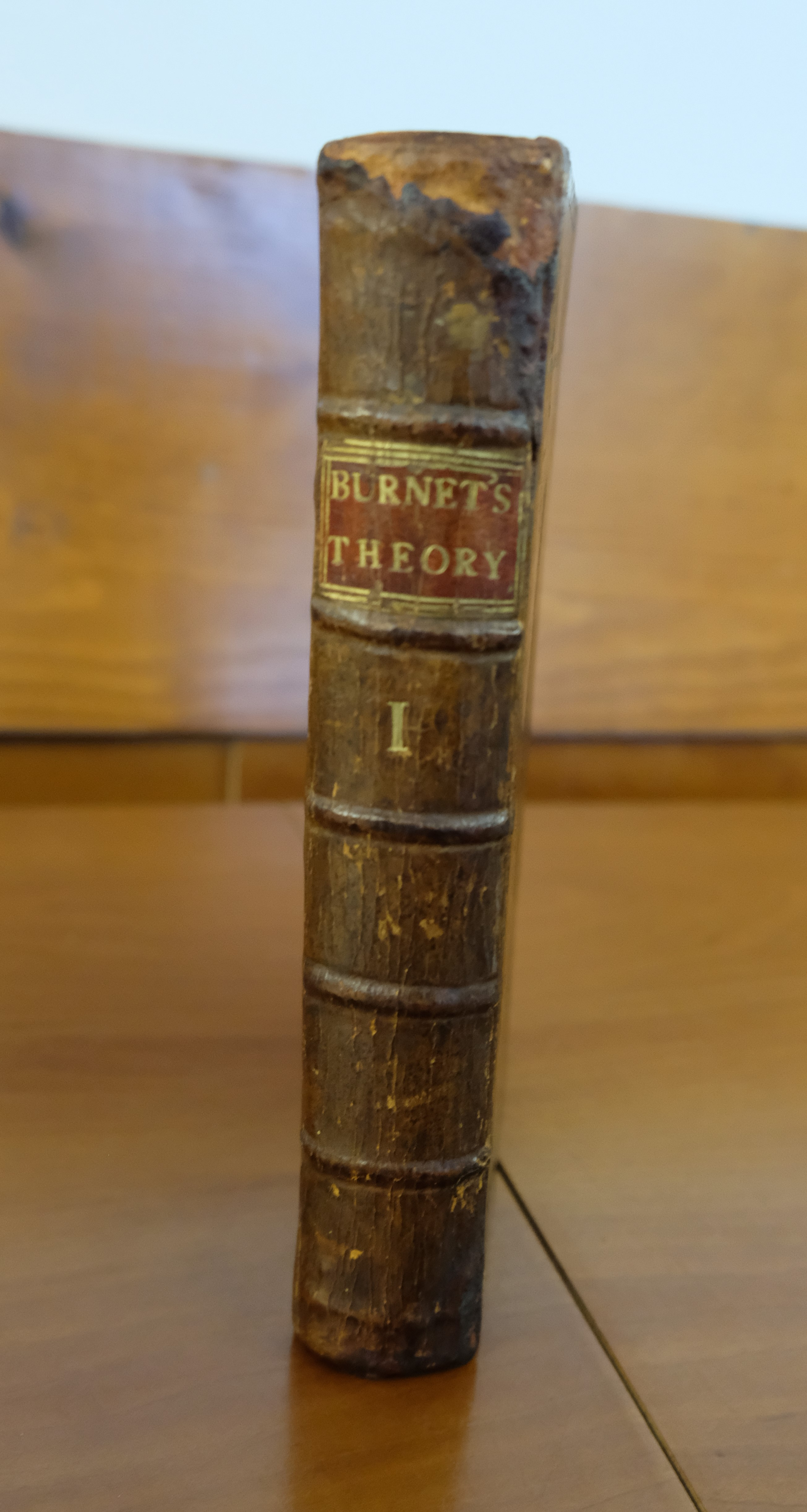
1719 copy of "The Sacred Theory of the Earth"

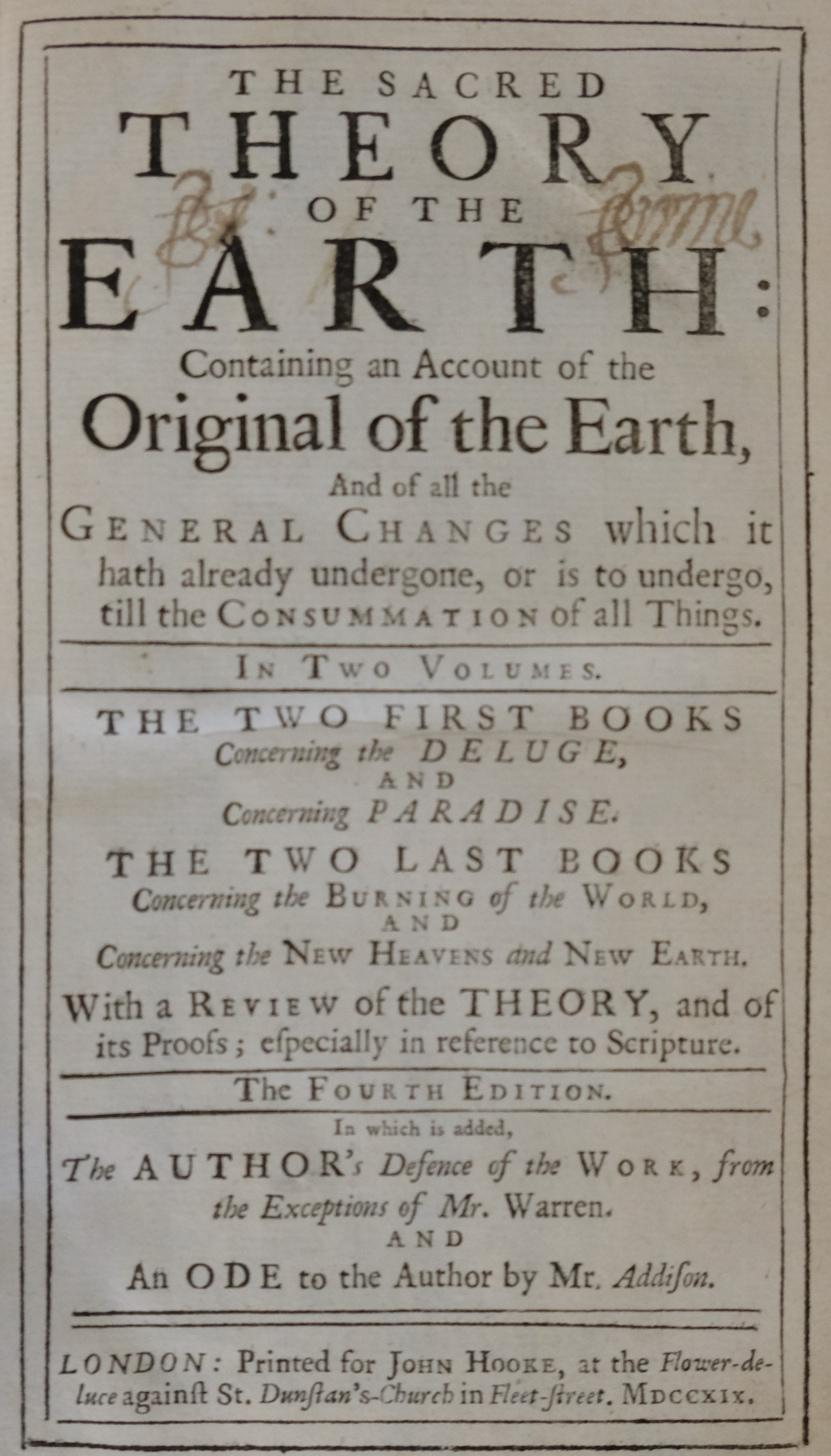
Title page of a 1719 copy of "The Sacred Theory of the Earth"

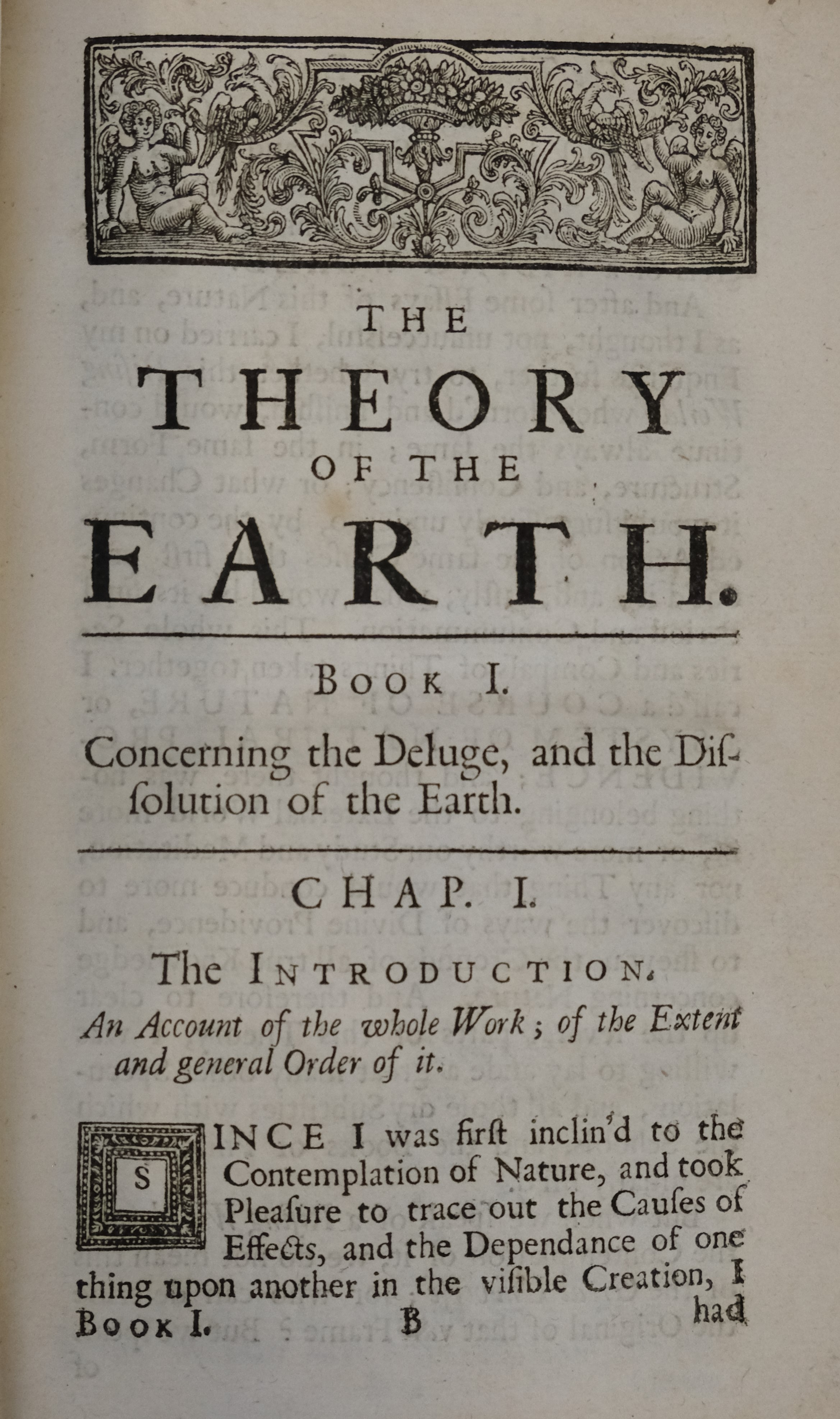
First page of a 1719 copy of "The Sacred Theory of the Earth"

=== The Ancient Doctrine Concerning the Origin of Things ===
Some of the views expressed in this work, also known as Archaeologiae Philosophicae sive Doctrina Antiqua de Rerum Originibus (1692), were so unacceptable to contemporary theologians that he had to resign his post at Court. In this he considered whether the fall of man was a symbolic event rather than literal history.

=== On the State of the Dead and of the Resurrection ===
Burnet's treatise De Statu Mortuorum et Resurgentium was published posthumously in 1720. In Edward Gibbon's The History of the Decline and Fall of the Roman Empire III p. 99 Gibbon made reference to Burnet's De Statu Mortuorum et Resurgentium noting that Burnet "exposes the inconveniences which must arise", if souls "possess a more active and sensible existence". Thomas Newton, Bishop of Bristol and Dean of St. Paul's, criticised Gibbon and claimed that Burnet's views were exactly the opposite.

== Influence ==
Burnet's work had an influence on Samuel Taylor Coleridge. He is quoted at the beginning of the 1817 edition of his The Rime of the Ancient Mariner.

The ridge Dorsa Burnet in the Ocean of Storms on the Moon was named after him.

== See also ==
- Time's Arrow, Time's Cycle, a book by Stephen Jay Gould that reassesses Burnet's work

== Sources ==
- Burnet, Thomas (1697). The Sacred Theory of the Earth (third ed.). London: Walter Kettilby.
- This article incorporates text from a publication now in the public domain: Stephen, Leslie (1886). "Burnet, Thomas (1635?–1715)". In Stephen, Leslie (ed.). Dictionary of National Biography. Vol. 07. London: Smith, Elder & Co.
