= Zinnemann =

Zinnemann is a surname. Notable people with the surname include:

- Fred Zinnemann (1907–1997), Jewish Austrian-American film director
- Tim Zinnemann (born 1940), American film director, producer, and photographer

== See also ==
- Zingerman's
