= Wrinkle ridge =

Feature commonly found on lunar maria

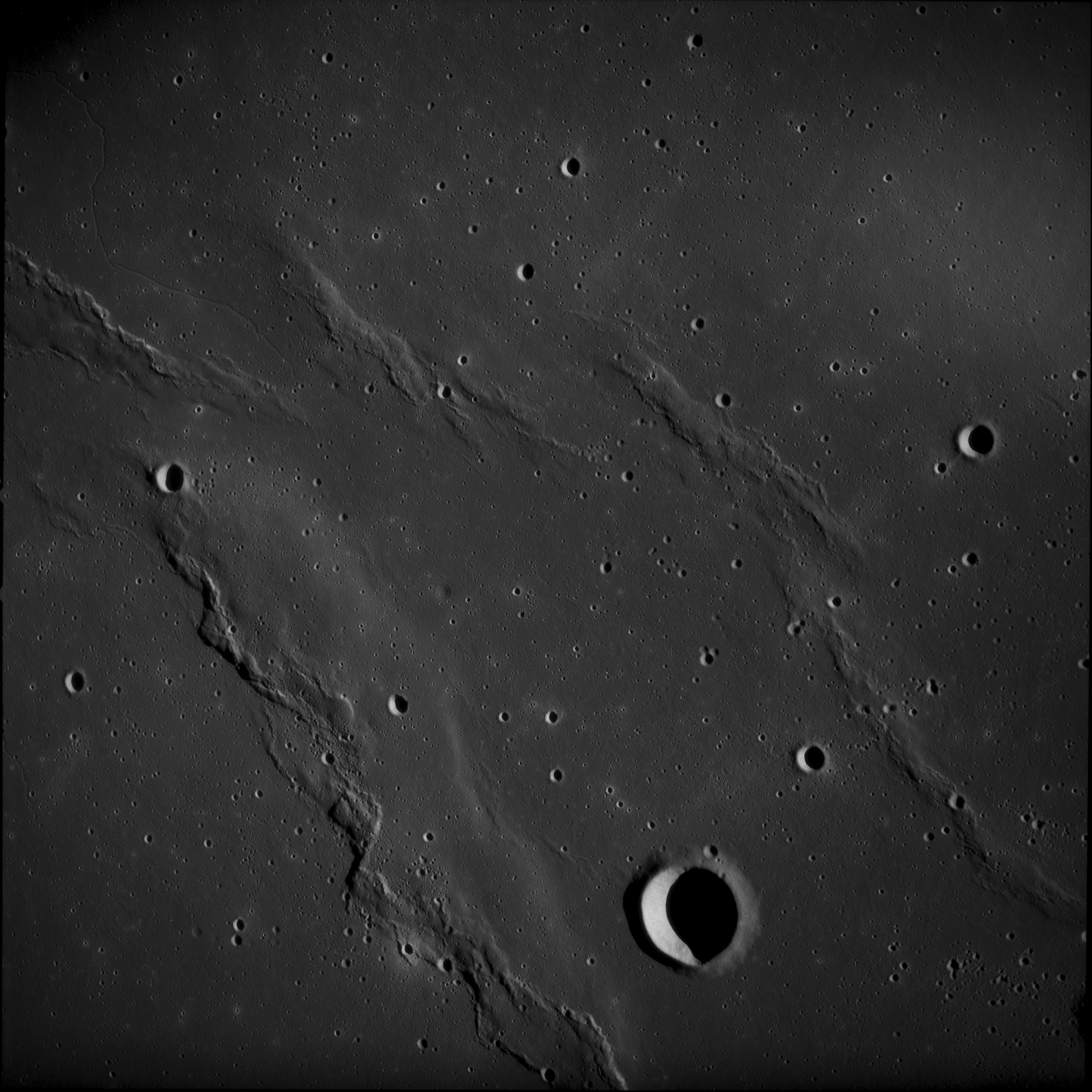
Unnamed wrinkle ridges north of the lunar crater Flamsteed, Oceanus Procellarum, from Apollo 12

A wrinkle ridge is a type of feature commonly found on lunar maria, or basalt plains. These features are low, sinuous ridges formed on the mare surface that can extend for up to several hundred kilometers. Wrinkle ridges are tectonic features created after the lava cooled and solidified. They frequently outline ring structures buried within the mare, follow circular patterns outlining the mare, or intersect protruding peaks. They are sometimes called veins due to their resemblance to the veins that protrude from beneath the skin.

== Origin and description ==
Wrinkle ridges are named with the Latin designation dorsum (plural dorsa). The standard IAU nomenclature uses the names of people (generally scientists) to identify wrinkle ridges on the Moon. For example, the Dorsa Burnet are named for Thomas Burnet, and the Dorsum Owen is named after George Owen of Henllys.

Wrinkle ridges can also be found on Mars, for example in Chryse Planitia, on several of the asteroids that have been visited by spacecraft, on Mercury, and certain moons of Jupiter and Saturn. Although several hypotheses have been advanced as causes of wrinkle ridges, today they are generally considered to be of tectonic origin. They involve folding and faulting. If correctly interpreted as thrust faults, where a rupture occurs and one side of the rupture is pushed on top of the other, they are evidence of compressional stress in planetary crust.

== Examples on the Moon ==
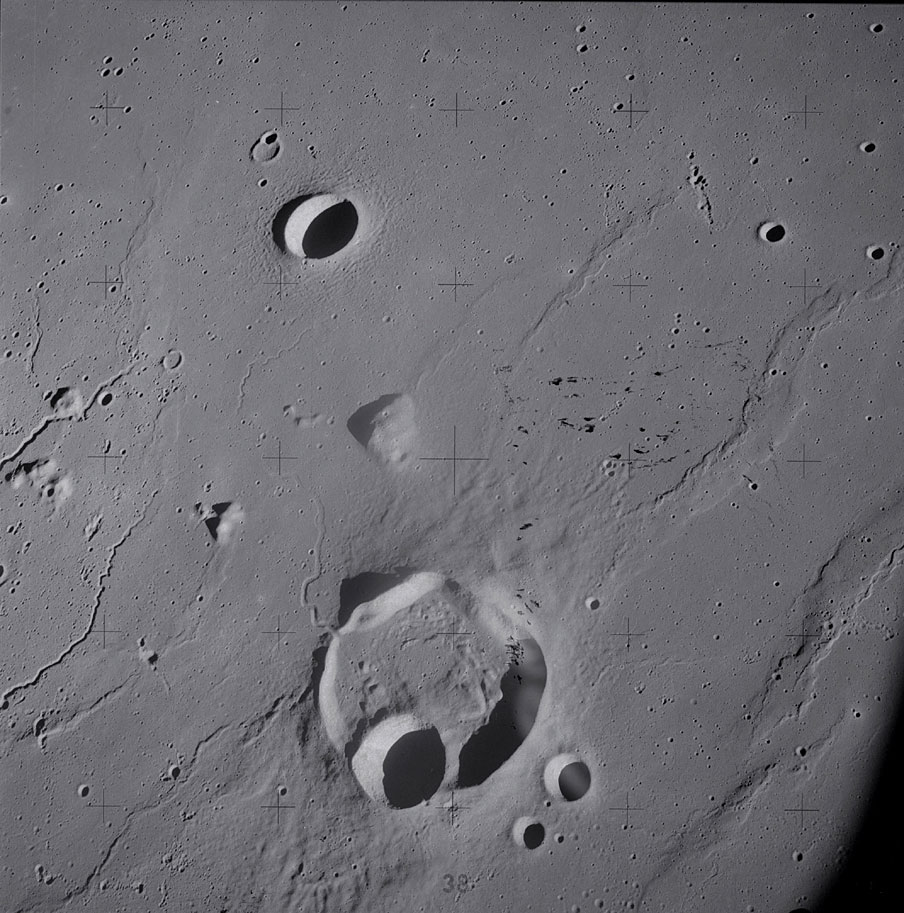
Lunar crater Krieger and vicinity, showing wrinkle ridges in the surrounding mare and sinuous rilles along the left edge, from Apollo 15

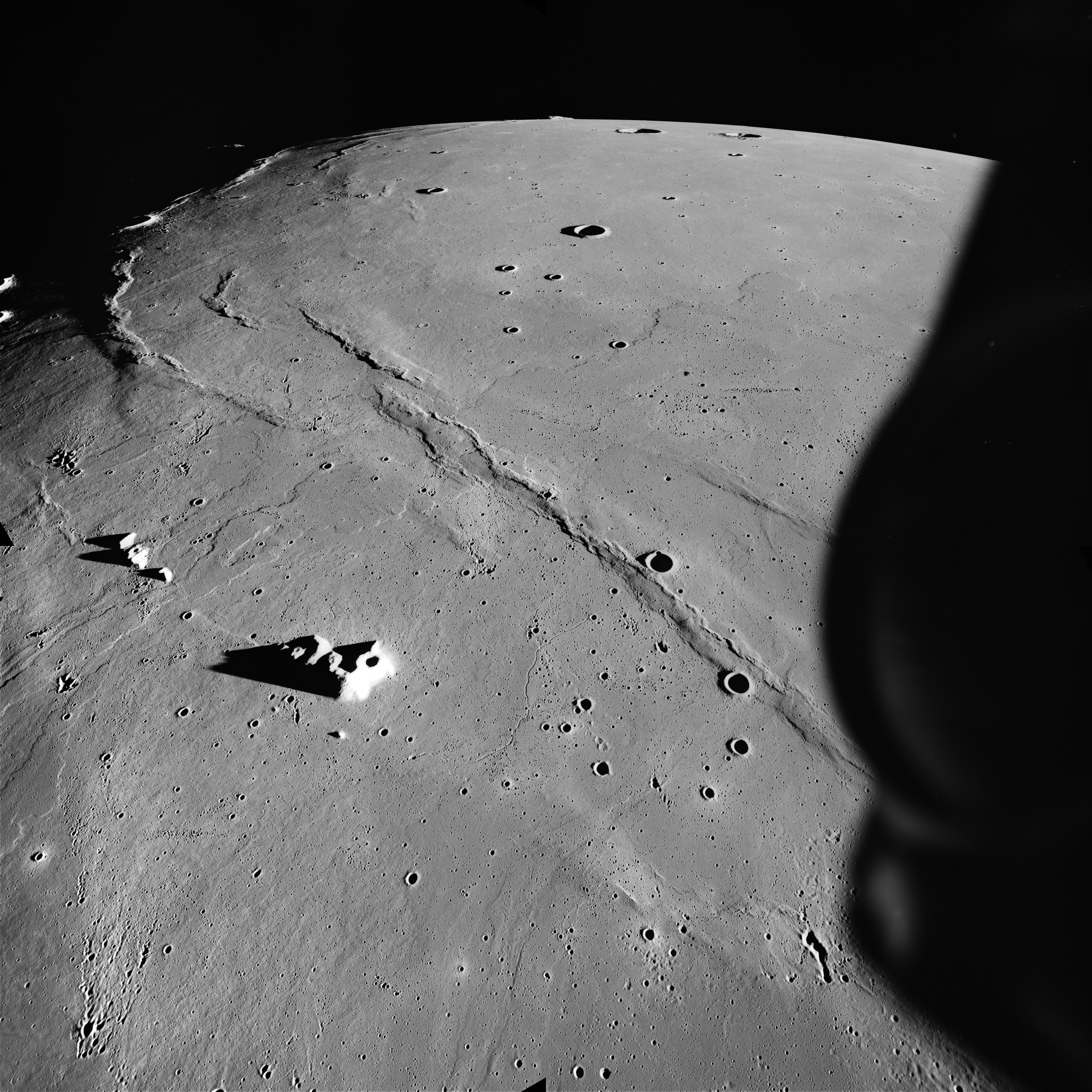
Dorsum Zirkel in Mare Imbrium, from Apollo 15

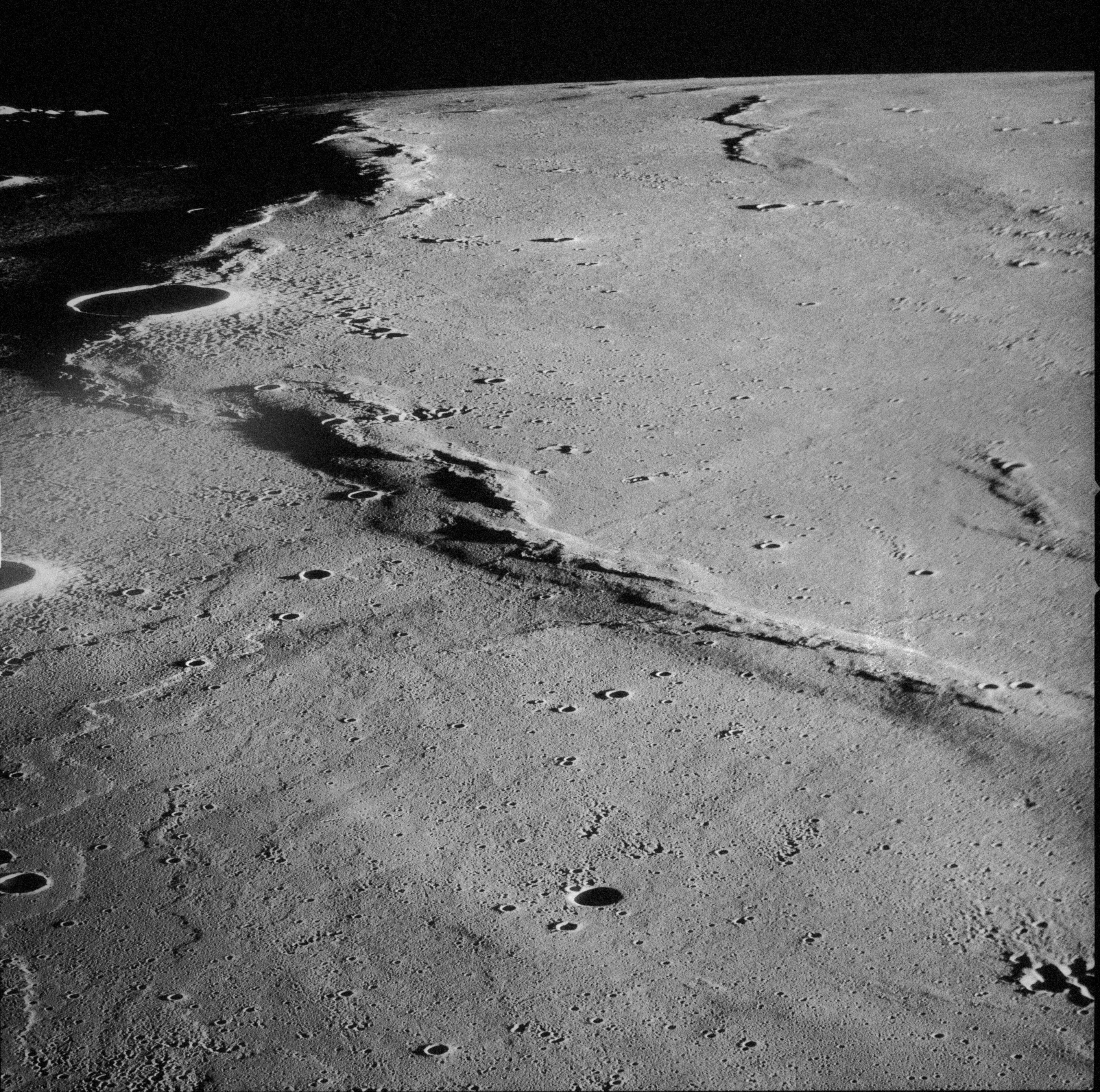
Oblique view of Dorsum Heim on the Moon, from Apollo 17

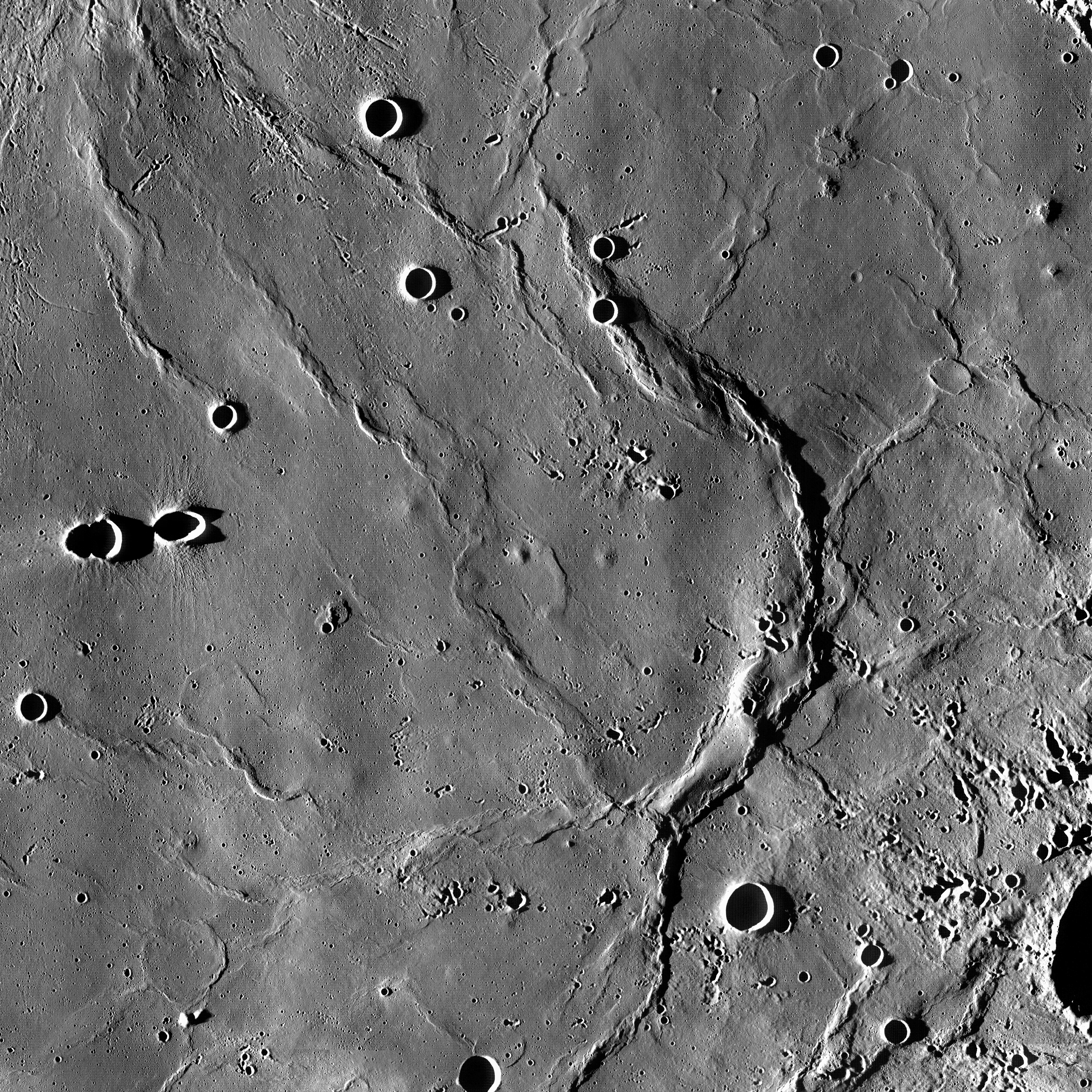
Dorsa Geikie is a prominent wrinkle ridge in Mare Fecunditatis. LRO mosaic.

== Examples on Mars ==
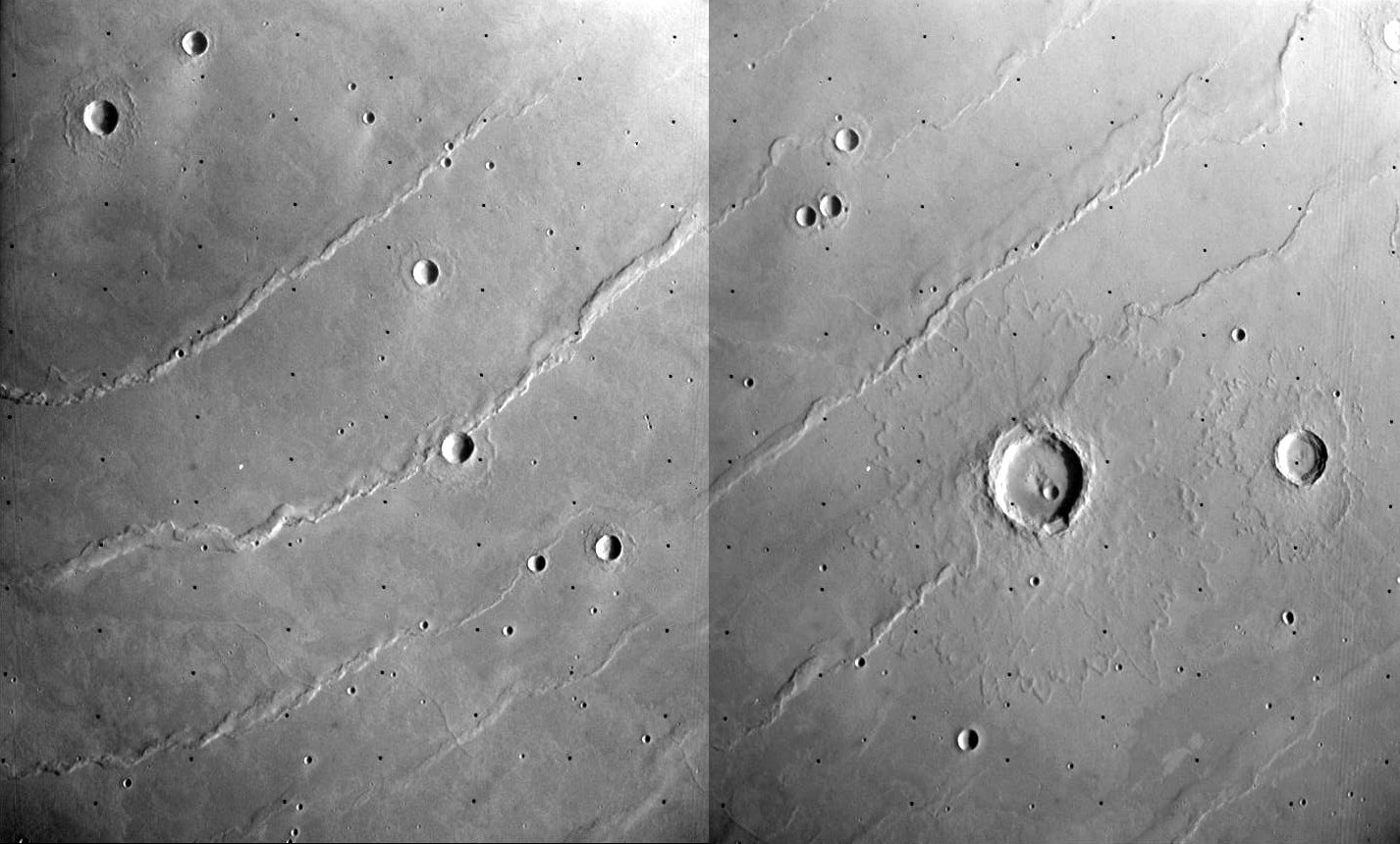
Solis Dorsa are an expansive set of parallel wrinkle ridges on Solis Planum on Mars. Viking 1 Oribiter mosaic.

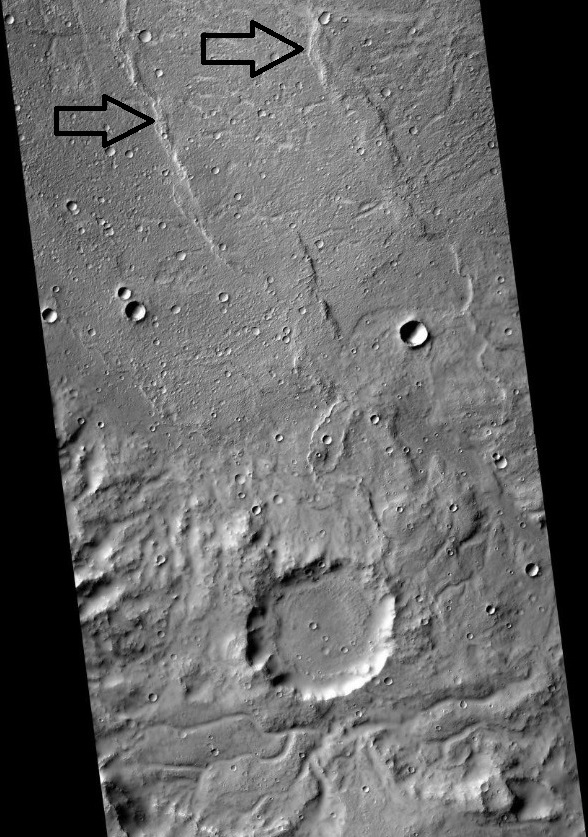
Floor and eroded south wall of the crater Flaugergues on Mars. Arrows point to wrinkle ridges.

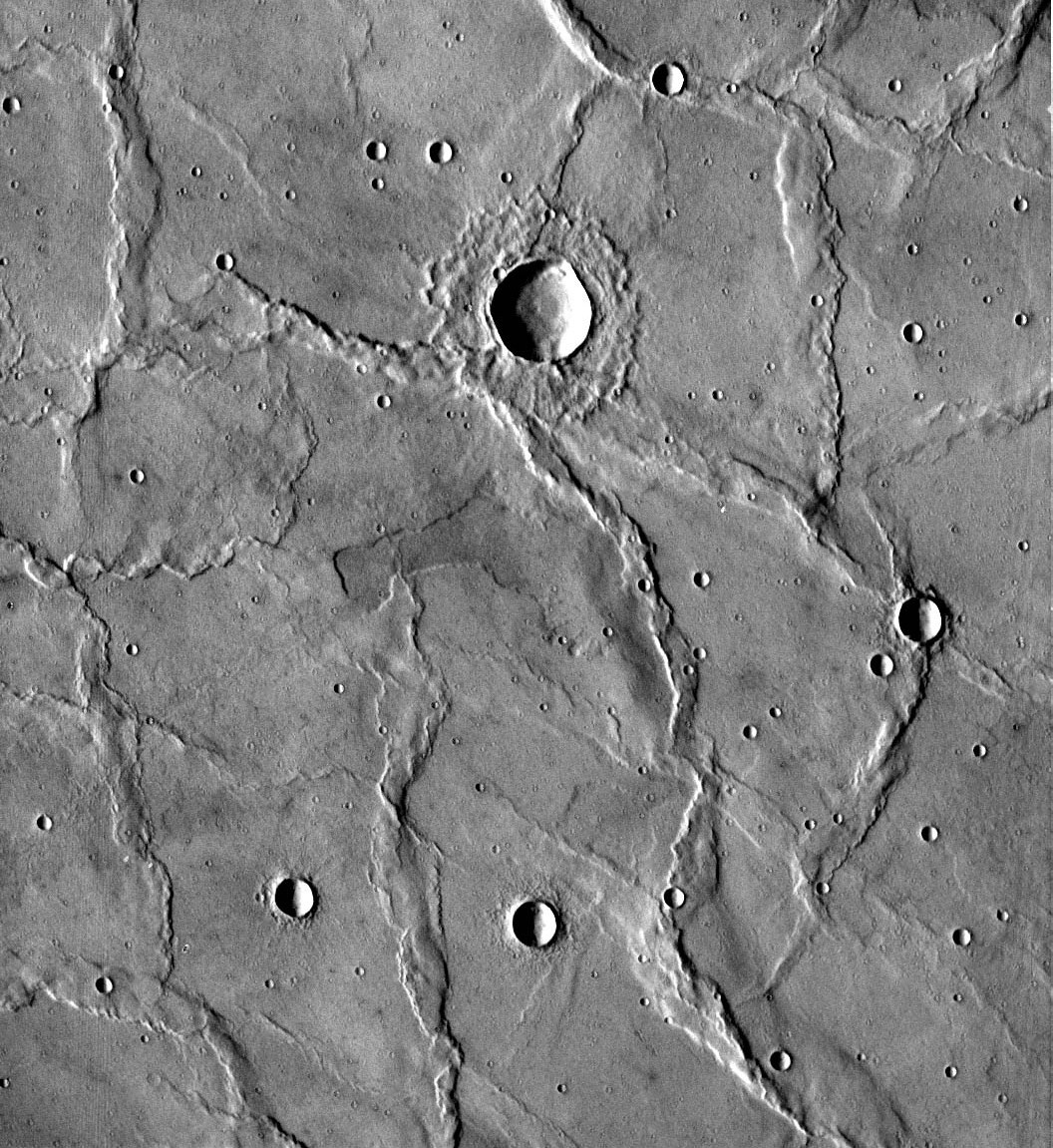
Wrinkle ridges in Hesperia Planum, Mars, as seen by Viking. The wrinkle ridges trend in different directions, so compressional forces may have changed direction over time.

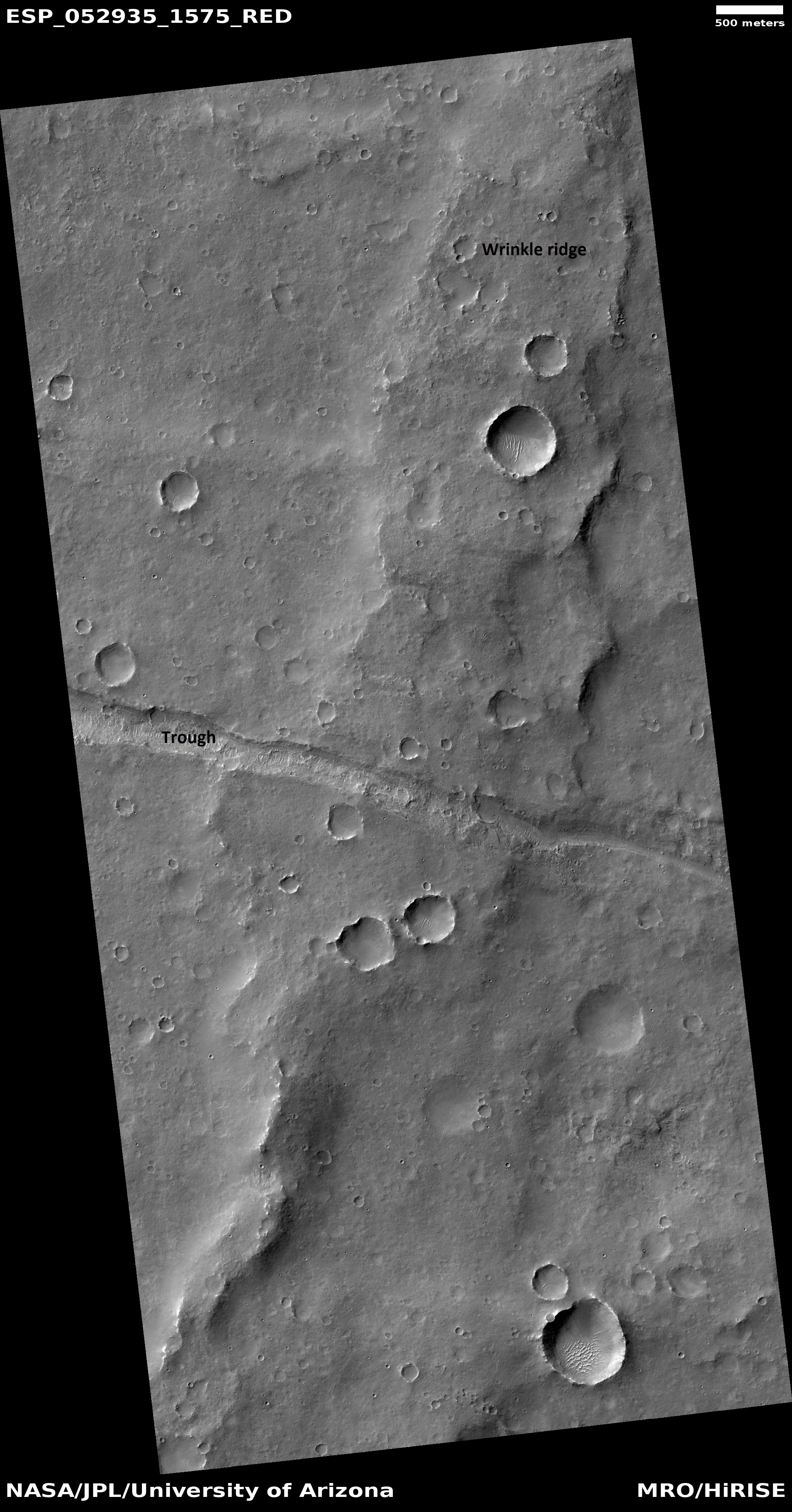
Trough cutting a wrinkle ridge, as seen by HiRISE under HiWish program. Location in the Coprates quadrangle, Mars.

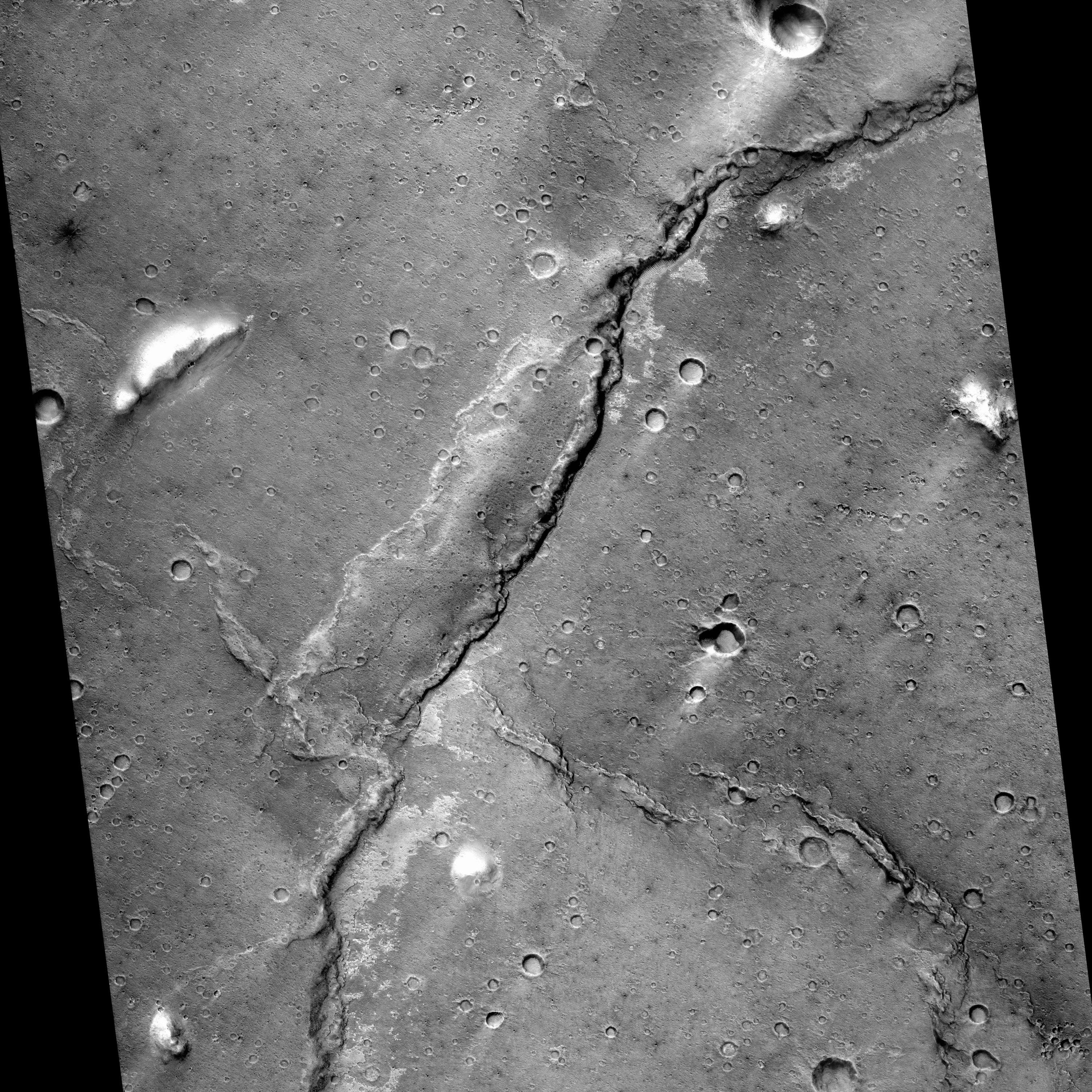
Wrinkle ridge in the Oxia Colles region of Mars

== Examples on Mercury ==
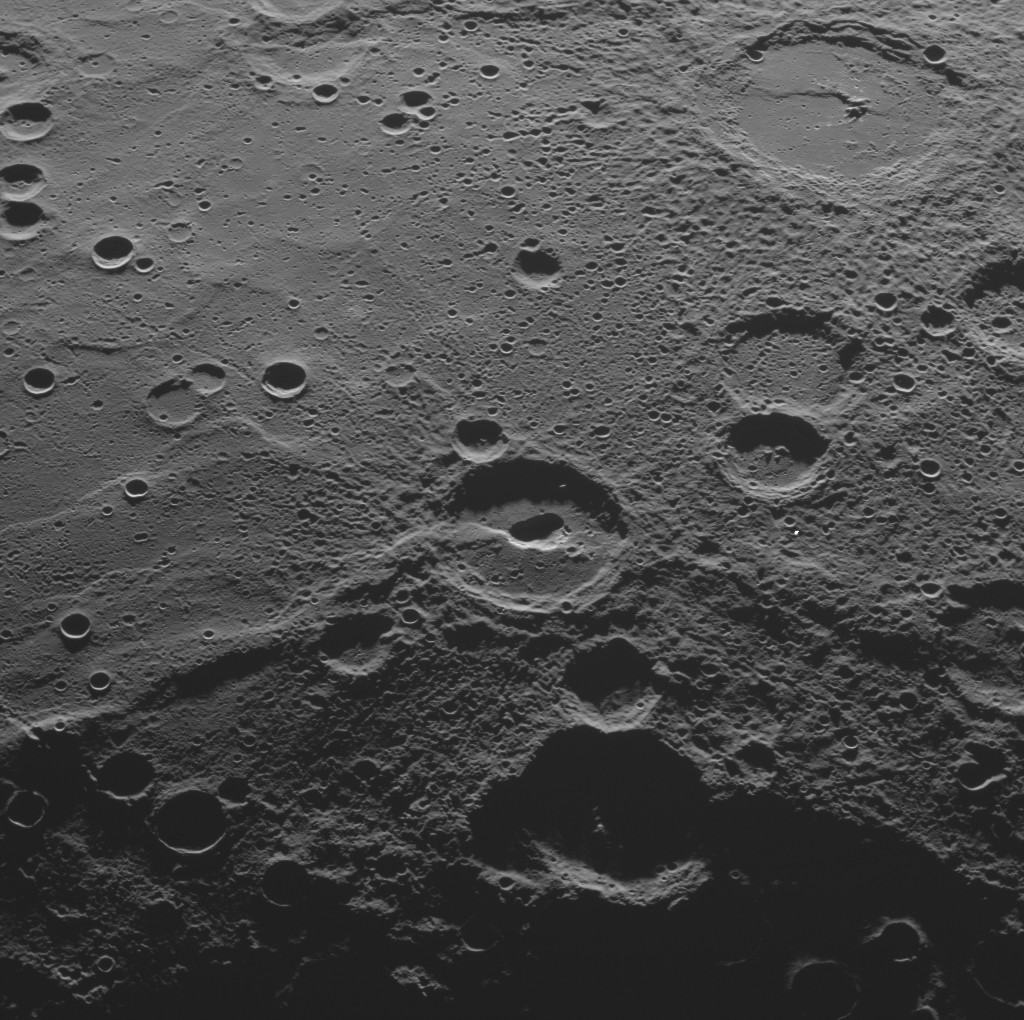
Antoniadi Dorsum cuts across the crater Geddes.

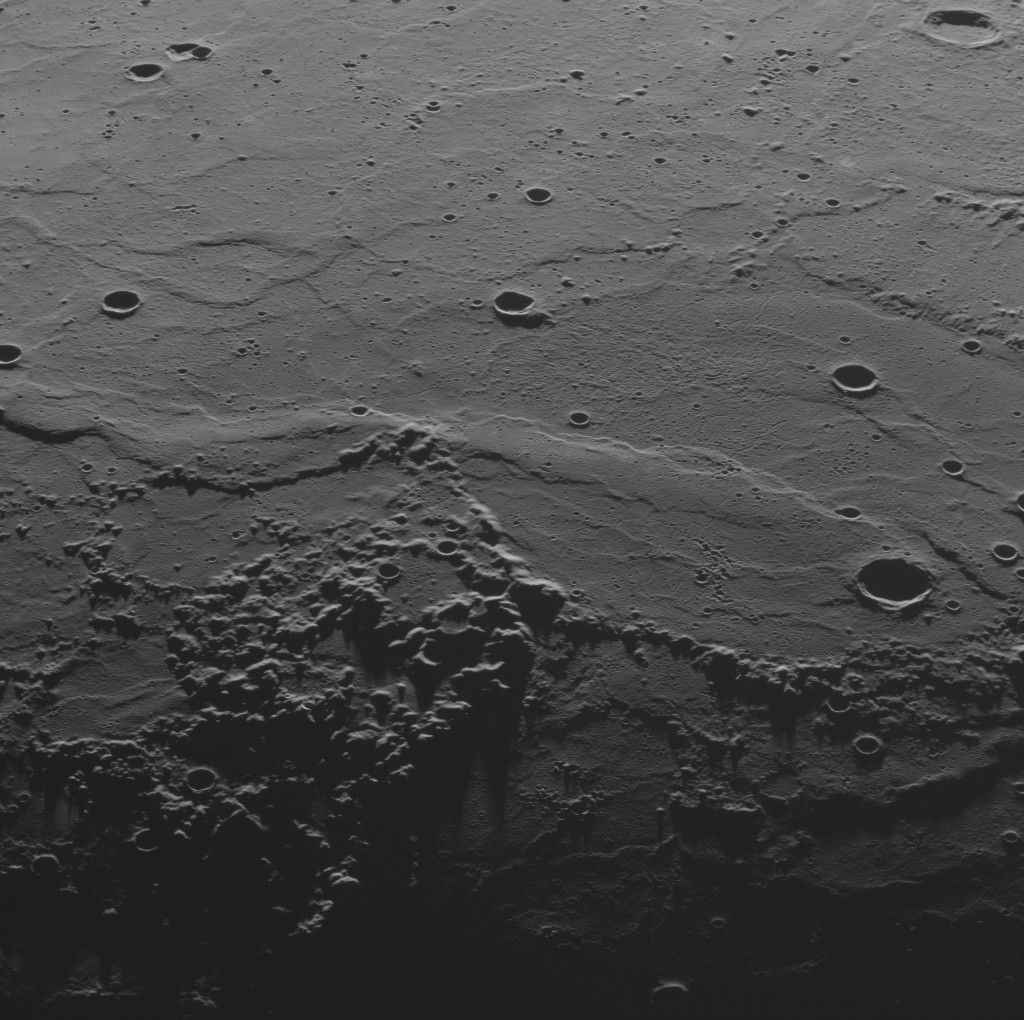
The prominent wrinkle ridge across the center is Schiaparelli Dorsum.

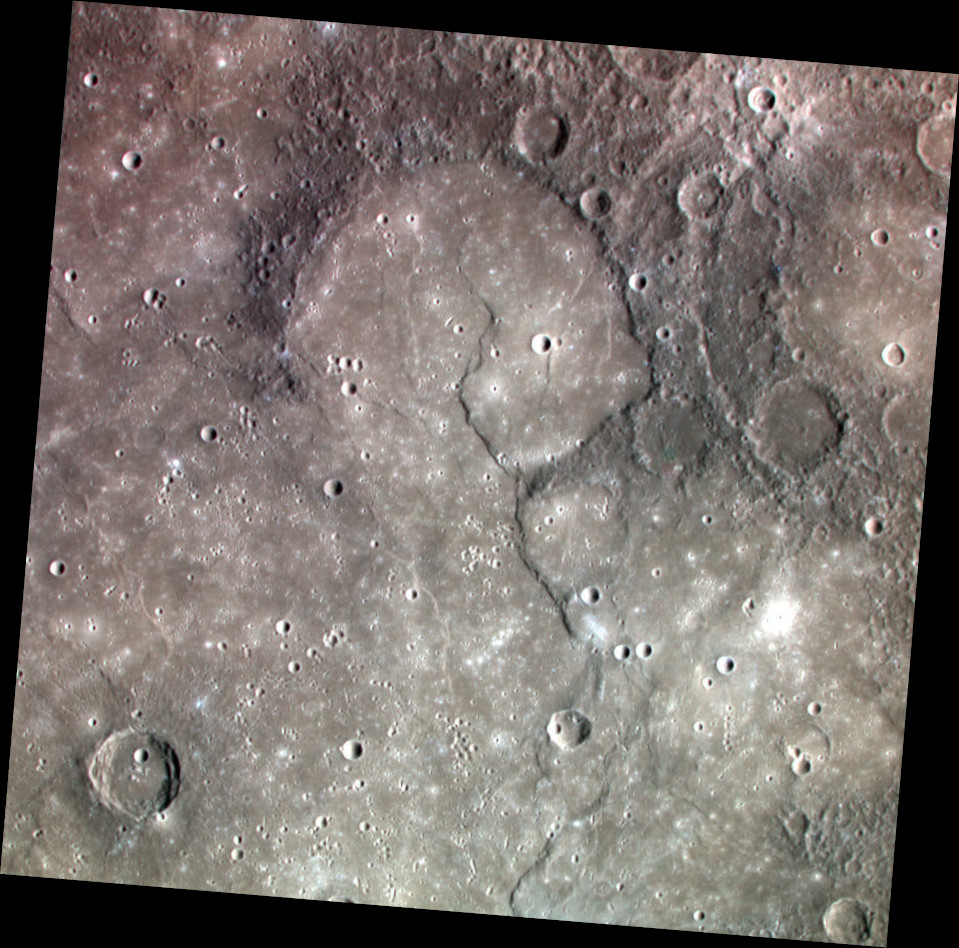
Wrinkle ridges trend north into the crater Faulkner.

== See also ==
- List of features on the Moon
- Planetary nomenclature

== Notes ==
- Golombek, M. P., F. S. Anderson, and M. T. Zuber (2001), Martian wrinkle ridge topography: Evidence for subsurface faults from MOLA, J. Geophys. Res., 106, 23,811–23,821, doi:10.1029/2000JE001308.
- Montési, L. G. J., and M. T. Zuber (2003), Clues to the lithospheric structure of Mars from wrinkle ridge sets and localization instability, J. Geophys. Res., 108(E6), 5048, doi:10.1029/2002JE001974.
- Watters, T. R. (1988), Wrinkle Ridge Assemblages on the Terrestrial Planets, J. Geophys. Res., 93(B9), 10,236–10,254, doi:10.1029/JB093iB09p10236.
- Watters, et al., Evidence of Recent Thrust Faulting on the Moon Revealed by the Lunar Reconnaissance Orbiter Camera. Science 20 August 2010: 936–940. doi:10.1126/science.1189590
- Ruj, T., and Kawai, K. (2021). A global investigation of wrinkle ridge formation events; implications towards the thermal evolution of Mars. Icarus, 114625, doi:10.1016/j.icarus.2021.114625.
