= Sam Zien =

American TV personality and cook (born 1959)

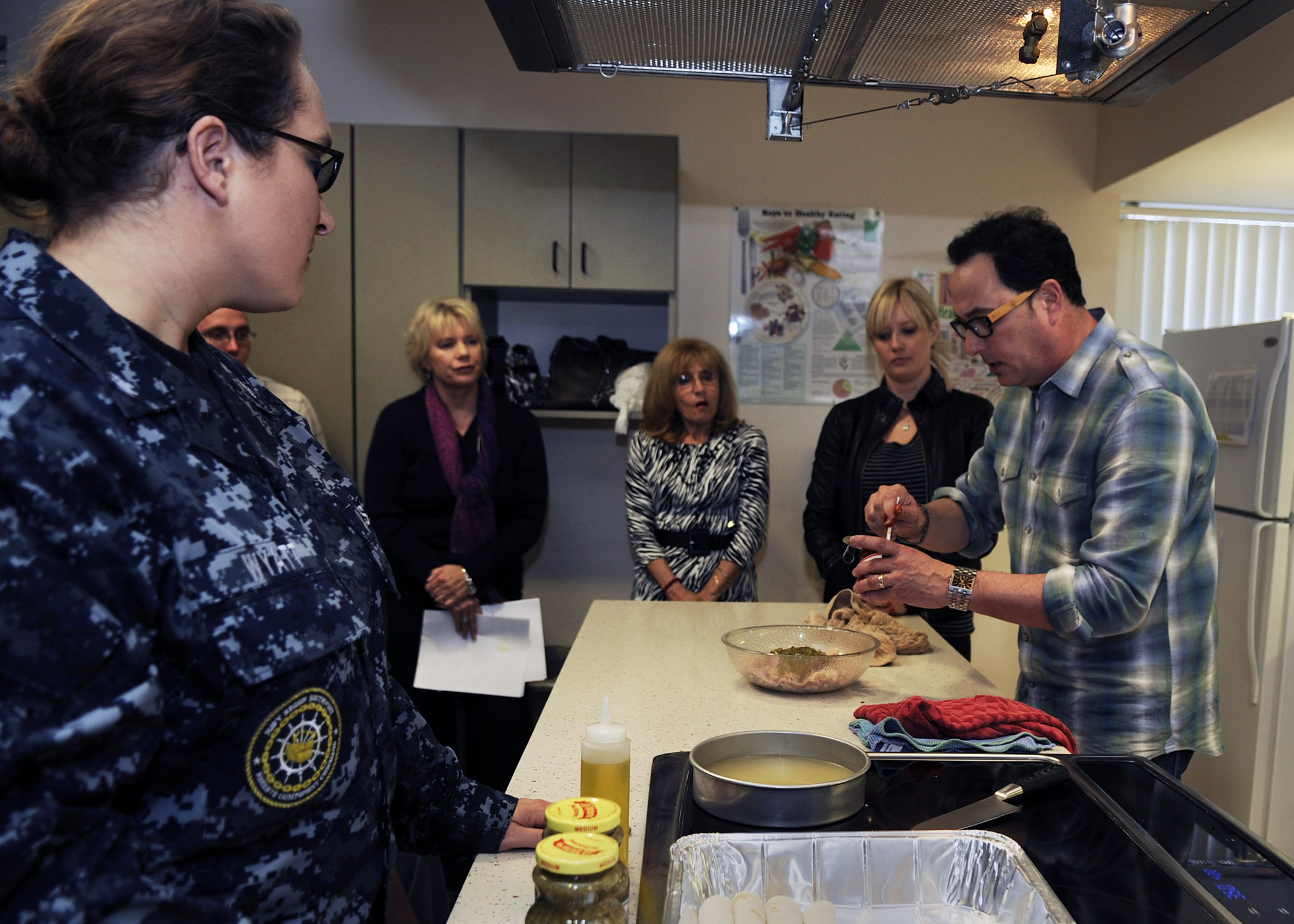
- Sam Zien (right) performing a cooking demonstration in January 2012
- Born: 7 August 1959 (age 66); Vancouver, British Columbia, Canada
- Occupations: YouTube personality; cook; author; restaurateur

YouTube information
- Channel: Sam the Cooking Guy
- Years active: 2011–present
- Genre: Cooking
- Subscribers: 3.84 million
- Views: 694 million
- Last updated: October 21, 2025
- Website: www.thecookingguy.com

Samuel D Zien (born August 7, 1959), known as Sam the Cooking Guy, is a Canadian-born American television cook, YouTuber, restaurateur, and cookbook author, based in San Diego, California.

== Television career ==
Zien's career in television began after quitting his job as an executive for a San Diego pharmaceutical company. In 2001, after a poorly timed effort to begin a career in travel television which was derailed by the September 11 attacks, he switched his focus to a cooking show. He produced his own test screening and distributed the tape to local San Diego television stations. San Diego's then-Fox affiliate XETV-TDT offered him a two to three minute slot during its morning news program. The job was unpaid—a situation that changed after his work earned a Regional Emmy from the National Television Academy's Pacific Southwest Chapter.

In January 2005, Zien moved to County Television Network (CTN), San Diego County's public-access television, after CTN offered him a half-hour time slot on their station. His Sam the Cooking Guy show spread to other cities through agreements with sister cable companies; his work was recognized with more Regional Emmys and a book deal from John Wiley and Sons.

Zien's next break came from the Discovery Health Channel, where Zien signed a deal to shoot the first season of a series called Just Grill This! The network was subsequently purchased by the Oprah Winfrey Network; Zien's show was not renewed for a second season.

== YouTube channel ==
On May 23, 2011, Zien premiered The Sam Livecast, an Internet cooking show originating from his home kitchen. Three new episodes per week feature food-related and other subject matters. After 200 live episodes, the production switched to a live-to-tape format.

After moving away from the live streamed format, The Sam Livecast transitioned into a YouTube channel under a different name - Sam the Cooking Guy - and experienced a surge in subscribers and views, reaching over 3 million subscribers by December 2021.

== Restaurants ==
In July 2018, Zien opened his first restaurant - Not Not Tacos - a casual dining establishment featuring Zien's unique take on non-traditional tacos. Located within the Little Italy Food Hall in the Little Italy area of downtown San Diego, Zien serves tacos such as Korean Short Rib, Pulled Pork with Macaroni and Cheese, Seared Salmon, and Meatloaf.

In March 2020, Zien opened a second restaurant in the Little Italy Food Hall, called Graze by Sam. The restaurant closed May 2024.

Zien, in partnership with Grain & Grit Collective, opened a third also located in the Little Italy Food Hall, called Samburgers in 2021.

In 2023, Zien opened a fourth restaurant in the Little Italy Food Hall, called CooCoo's Nest. It is a fried chicken outlet with a "70's flair."

Zien announced in January 2025 that he was stepping away from the restaurant industry and would no longer a partner in Samburgers, Basta, or Not Not.

== Cookbooks ==
Zien has written five cookbooks. All were published by John Wiley & Sons except this most recent book was published by Countryman Press:

- Just a Bunch of Recipes (2008, ISBN 9780470043738)
- Awesome Recipes and Kitchen Shortcuts (2010, ISBN 9780470467947)
- Just Grill This! (2011, ISBN 9780470467930)
- Sam the Cooking Guy: Recipes with Intentional Leftovers (2020, ISBN 9781682686027)
- Sam the Cooking Guy: Between the Buns: Burgers, Sandwiches, Tacos, Burritos, Hot Dogs & More (2022, ISBN 9781682686881)
