= Golgi (crater) =

Crater on the Moon

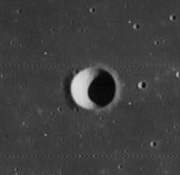
- Lunar Orbiter 4 image
- Coordinates: 27.8°N 60.0°W
- Diameter: 5 km
- Depth: Unknown
- Colongitude: 60° at sunrise
- Eponym: Camillo Golgi

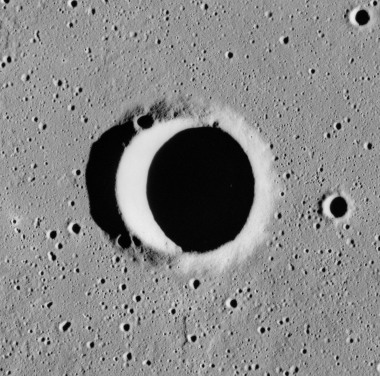
Apollo 15 image

Golgi is a tiny lunar impact crater located in the Oceanus Procellarum, over 150 kilometers to the north of the crater Schiaparelli. It is a circular, cup-shaped impact formation with an interior albedo that is higher than the surrounding dark lunar mare. This crater was previously designated Schiaparelli D before being given a name by the IAU.
