= Metaplasticity =

Psychological term

Metaplasticity is a term originally coined by W.C. Abraham and M.F. Bear to refer to the plasticity of synaptic plasticity. Until that time synaptic plasticity had referred to the plastic nature of individual synapses. However this new form referred to the plasticity of the plasticity itself, thus the term meta-plasticity. The idea is that the synapse's previous history of activity determines its current plasticity. This may play a role in some of the underlying mechanisms thought to be important in memory and learning such as long-term potentiation (LTP), long-term depression (LTD) and so forth. These mechanisms depend on current synaptic "state", as set by ongoing extrinsic influences such as the level of synaptic inhibition, the activity of modulatory afferents such as catecholamines, and the pool of hormones affecting the synapses under study. Recently, it has become clear that the prior history of synaptic activity is an additional variable that influences the synaptic state, and thereby the degree, of LTP or LTD produced by a given experimental protocol. In a sense, then, synaptic plasticity is governed by an activity-dependent plasticity of the synaptic state; such plasticity of synaptic plasticity has been termed metaplasticity. There is little known about metaplasticity, and there is much research currently underway on the subject, despite its difficulty of study, because of its theoretical importance in brain and cognitive science. Most research of this type is done via cultured hippocampus cells or hippocampal slices.

== Hebbian plasticity ==
The brain is "plastic", meaning it can be molded and formed. This plasticity is what allows you to learn throughout your lifetime; your synapses change based on your experience. New synapses can be made, old ones destroyed, or existing ones can be strengthened or weakened. The original theory of plasticity is called "Hebbian plasticity", named after Donald Hebb in 1949. A quick but effective summary of Hebbian theory is that "cells that fire together, wire together", together being the key word here which will be explained shortly. Hebb described an early concept of the theory, not the actual mechanics themselves. Hebbian plasticity involves two mechanisms: LTP and LTD, discovered by Bliss and Lomo in 1973. LTP, or long-term potentiation, is the increase of synapse sensitivity due to a prolonged period of activity in both the presynaptic and postsynaptic neuron. This prolonged period of activity is normally concentrated electric impulses, usually around 100 Hz. It is called "coincidence" detection in that it only strengthens the synapse if there was sufficient activity in both the presynaptic and postsynaptic cells. If the postsynaptic cell does not become sufficiently depolarized then there is no coincidence detection and LTP/LTD do not occur. LTD, or long-term depression, works the same way however it focuses on a lack of depolarization coincidence. LTD can be induced by electrical impulses at around 5 Hz. These changes are synapse specific. A neuron can have many different synapses all controlled via the same mechanisms defined here.

The earliest proposed mechanism for plastic activity is based around glutamate receptors and their ability to change in number and strength based on synapse activity. Glutamate binds two main receptor types: AMPA receptors (AMPARs) and NMDA receptors (NMDARs). These are named after drugs that bind to the receptors: alpha-amino-3-hydroxy-5-methyl-4-isoxazolepropionic acid (AMPA) and N-methyl-D-aspartate (NMDA), respectively, but they both bind glutamate. When a glutamatergic synapse releases glutamate it binds to any AMPA and the NMDA receptors present in the postsynaptic membrane. The AMPA receptors are ionotropic receptors that are responsible for fast synaptic transmission. In a nutshell the NMDA receptors evoke a response in the cell only when sufficient glutamate has been transmitted to cause that cell to depolarize enough to unblock the NMDA receptor. Sufficient depolarization in the membrane will cause the magnesium cation blockade in the NMDA receptors to vacate, thus allowing calcium influx into the cell. NMDA receptors are "coincidence detectors". They determine when the presynaptic and postsynaptic neuron are linked in time via activity. When this occurs, NMDA receptors become the control mechanism that dictates how the AMPA and NMDA receptors are to be rearranged. The rearrangement of AMPA and NMDA receptors has become the central focus of current studies of metaplasticity as it directly determines LTP and LTD thresholds. However, some evidence indicates that G protein-coupled receptors (GPCRs) are responsible for controlling NMDA receptor activity, which suggests that NMDAR-mediated changes in synaptic strength are modulated by the activity of GPCRs. There is large amounts of research focused on finding the specific enzymes and intracellular pathways involved in the NMDAR-mediated modulation of membrane AMPA receptors. Recent biochemical research has shown that a deficiency in the protein tenascin-R (TNR) leads to a metaplastic increase in the threshold for LTP induction. TNR is an extracellular-matrix protein expressed by oligodendrocytes during myelination.

== Synaptic states ==
Research in 2004 has shown that synapses do not strengthen or weaken on a sliding scale. There are discrete states that synapses move between. These states are active, silent, recently silent, potentiated, and depressed. The states which they can move to are dependent on the state that they are in at the moment. Thus, the future state is determined by the state gained by previous activity. For instance, silent (but not recently silent) synapses can be converted to active via the insertion of AMPARs in the postsynaptic membrane. Active synapses can move to either potentiated or depressed via LTP or LTD respectively. Prolonged low-frequency stimulation (5 Hz, the method used to induce LTD) can move an active synapse to depressed and then silent. However, synapses that have just become active cannot be depressed or silenced. Thus there is state-machine-like behavior at the synapse when it comes to transitions. However, the states themselves can have varying degrees of intensity. One active-state synapse can be stronger than another active-state synapse. This is, in theory, how you can have a strong memory vs. a weak memory. The strong memories are the ones with very heavily populated active synapses, while weak memories may still be active but poorly populated with AMPARs. The same research has shown that NMDA receptors themselves, once thought to be the control mechanism behind AMPA receptor organization, can be regulated by synaptic activity. This regulation of the regulation mechanism itself adds another layer of complexity to the biology of the brain.

== Synaptic tagging ==
Recent research has found a mechanism known as synaptic tagging. When new receptor proteins are being expressed and synthesized they must also be transported to the synaptic membrane, and some sort of chemical messaging is required for this. Their research has shown that activation of cAMP/PKA signaling pathways is required for LTP induction due to its "tagging" nature. It was even shown that simple pharmacological activation of cAMP/PKA pathways was sufficient for the synapse to be tagged, completely independent of any sort of activity.

== NMDA receptors ==
The NMDA receptor is made up of three subunits: GluN1 (formerly NR1), a variable GluN2 (formerly NR2) subunit, and a variable GluN3 (formerly NR3) subunit. Two GluN2 subunits in particular have been the subject of intense study: GluN2A and GluN2B. The GluN2B subunit not only is more sensitive to glutamate and takes longer to desensitize, but also allows more calcium entrance into the cell when it opens. A low GluN2A/GluN2B ratio is generally correlated with a decreased threshold of activation caused by rearing animals in light-deprived environments. This has been shown experimentally via light deprivation studies in which it was shown that the GluN2A/B ratio declined. The threshold can be increased in some situations via light exposure. Studies of this nature were used to find the critical period for formation of the visual system in cats. This shifting ratio is a measurement of LTD/LTP threshold and thus has been posited as a metaplasticity mechanism.

== Gliotransmitters ==
Glial cells not only provide structural and nutritional support for neurons, but also provide processing support via chemicals known as gliotransmitters. Gliotransmitters include glutamate, ATP, and, more recently, the amino acid D-serine. Once thought to be glycine itself, D-serine serves as a ligand in the glycine site of NMDARs. D-serine is synthesized by astrocytes and is heavily co-localized with NMDARs. Without D-serine there can be no NMDA-induced neurotoxicity, or almost any NMDA response of any kind. Due to this evidence it is clear that D-serine is an essential ligand for the NMDA receptors. An essential factor in this research is the fact that astrocytes will vary their coverage of neurons based on the physiological processes of the body. Oxytocin and vasopressin neurons will have more NMDA receptors exposed due to astrocyte activity during lactation than during normal functioning. This research took place mostly in cells from the hypothalamic supraoptic nucleus (SON). Due to synaptic plasticity being almost completely dependent on NMDAR processing, dynamic astrocyte NMDAR coverage is by nature a metaplasticity parameter.

== Synaptic homeostasis ==
Homeostatic plasticity manages synaptic connections across the entire cell in an attempt to keep them at manageable connection levels. Hebbian methods tend to drive networks into either a maximized state or a minimized state of firing, thus limiting the potential activity and growth of the network. With homeostatic mechanisms in place there is now a sort of "gain control" which allows these Hebbian methods to be checked in order to maintain their information processing abilities. This kind of modulation is important to combat intense lack of neural activity, such as prolonged sensory deprivation (in this study in particular it is light-deprivation affecting visual cortex neurons) or damage caused by stroke. Synaptic scaling is a mechanism in place to hold synapse sensitivity at normalized levels. Prolonged periods of inactivity increase the sensitivity of the synapses so that their overall activity level can remain useful. Chronic activity causes desensitization of the receptors, lowering overall activity to a more biologically manageable level. Both AMPA and NMDA receptor levels are affected by this process and so the overall "weight" of each synaptic connection (refined by Hebbian methods) is maintained while still increasing the overall level of activity over the entire neuron. It has been shown that both the presynaptic and the postsynaptic neuron are involved in the process, changing the vesicle turnover rate and AMPA receptor composition respectively.

Recent research has found that the calcium-dependent enzyme CaMKII, which exists in an alpha and beta isoform, is key in inactivity-dependent modulation. A low alpha/beta ratio causes an increased threshold for cellular excitation via calcium influx and thus favors LTP.

=== Memory formation ===
There are several different stages of sleep, but only two separate types, REM (or rapid-eye movement) and NREM (non-rapid eye movement). NREM sleep is characterized by slow-wave neuronal activity known as theta waves, or delta waves. These slow-wave oscillations occur at very low frequencies, between 0.5 and 4.5 Hz. A recent hypothesis has come to the surface, integrating sleep and something known as synaptic homeostasis.

The hypothesis comes in four parts:

1. Wakefulness is associated with synaptic potentiation;
2. Synaptic potentiation is tied to the regulation of slow-wave activity in sleep;
3. Slow-wave activity is associated with synaptic depression;
4. Synaptic downscaling is tied to the beneficial effects of sleep.

Wakefulness is associated with synaptic potentiation: Potentiation is happening all the time: through the many hours we spend reading useless information, or encountering something longer than 5 minutes, i.e. that random person who stood in front of us at the grocery store. Everything that we see, read, or focus on, is being potentiated somewhere in our brain.

Synaptic potentiation is tied to the regulation of slow-wave activity in sleep: Whenever a particular area in our brain receives extensive potentiation from our day, the affected area undergoes more slow-wave activity than its neighbors do. In essence, the amount of potentiation we receive during our day, effects the type of sleep we get at night. If we spend all day sick and lying in bed, not much potentiation is happening. Sure, the colors of the walls, curtains, bed sheets, etc. but that isn't surprisingly interesting. The amount of slow-wave oscillation activity that would be present at night would not be extensive in the slightest.

Slow-wave activity is associated with synaptic depression: Synaptic depression is the other side to synaptic potentiation. If LTP is formed from strongly depolarizing stimuli, or high frequency stimuli, then long-term depression, LTD, is formed from prolonged periods of very weak stimuli or very low frequency stimulus. The hypothesis proposes that the slow wave activity is enough to evoke LTD, or downscaling, of the cells.

Synaptic downscaling is tied to the beneficial effects of sleep: This is what ties it all together. LTD from the synaptic downscaling of the slow wave activity causes just the right amount of reduction to our neuronal firing patterns. The prolonged LTD from sleep would allow for all the non-essential LTP that took place during our day to become forfeit. It helps reduce the amount of synaptic noise that is created when so much potentiation happens during the day.

What does this all mean?: The idea is LTP is occurring all the time during wakefulness. All of this information flow and storage will eventually become too much, and that is why we sleep. The point of sleep is to downgrade and eliminate some of the synaptic potentials that are not necessary from throughout our day. What one was wearing on the third Tuesday last February is irrelevant, but knowing one's middle name isn't. Extensive LTP has been put in place to remember one's middle name, and therefore that synaptic pathway would not be so easily forgotten, whereas what one was wearing on that one particular day received so little potentiation it can be forgotten in a day or two. A lot of potentiation on a certain topic would help facilitate that memory, making it "more important" in the 'eyes of the cortex' so it is not forgotten.

=== What else may be involved ===
The circadian rhythm taking hold is responsible for the feeling of fatigue. Our body naturally starts to shut down, around the time that the sun starts to take its dip into the horizon. The primary chemical for this happening is melatonin, so it would seem natural to wonder if melatonin has some effect on learning and memory formation as well. Every animal that sleeps also exhibits some bodily concentration of melatonin. When studying the effects of sleepiness on fish, it was found that any significant amount of melatonin causes a "dramatic decrease" in learning and memory formation.

This study was performed at night under bright lights, to inhibit the release of natural amounts of melatonin and learning behaviors were conducted. The authors also gave a drug to the fish to help block the effects of melatonin and then studied their behavioral patterns on memory formation and retrieval. It was found that in the daytime when melatonin was artificially administered, the fish's ability to learn new material was at its lowest.

As one stays awake for a long time, so much extra potentiation has already happened from the waking day, and trying to force more LTP isn't going to help anything. Too much extra information is floating around, and the neurons can't handle all of the extra activity. In addition, however, as the night starts to loom, the circadian rhythm begins to take effect and the body naturally begins to release stores of melatonin. This increase in melatonin reduces the ability to learn and facilitate new memories. The ability for melatonin to suppress memory formation is very significant, however. The melatonin would work in conjunction with the LTD during slow oscillations during sleep, to keep individuals from potentiating unwanted, or unneeded, information from their day.

Is sleep the only thing that matters in this synaptic homeostasis hypothesis? In February 2002, two separate articles were published on the discovery of a receptors' involvement in synaptic homeostasis. Bone morphogenetic proteins, BMPs, were originally found to cause a differentiation in bone formation; however, they have recently been discovered necessary for synaptic regulation. It was noticed that when there were mutations in the BMP type II receptor, more commonly known as wishful thinking or wit for short, the sizes of synaptic clefts were significantly reduced, as well as the synaptic output in the studied species.

The amount of neurotransmitters that were stored and released by these cells was also found to be exceedingly lacking, so further studies were conducted. When the wit receptor is activated, a particular protein known as LIMK1 becomes active as well.

Eaton and Davis also studied the synaptic footprints of the cells. The synaptic footprints are indications that a synapse was once there, but no longer contains the axon terminus, and therefore the synaptic footprints are located in the postsynaptic cell in the dendrites. In mutated wit receptors, the amount of synaptic footprints was increased by almost 50%, indicating that the BMP receptor and its cellular counterpart, the LIMK1 protein, are significantly responsible for growth of a cell.

Why is any of this important, and what does it mean? Significant amounts of LTP would be required if we are to keep our already formed memories. During sleep, the slow wave oscillations cause an overall synaptic depression throughout the brain, where only the stronger neuronal pathways are kept from the previous day's LTP. There is a second requirement, however, if we are to keep our neuronal synapses. The wishful thinking receptor also has to be active if the synapses are to be kept. If a newly formed synapse is the result from some potentiation from the day, then presumably that synapse would not have had the time to form the wit pathways from the cell. Without wishful thinking activation, the synapses are much more prone to destruction and would likely get removed, likewise, very heavily potentiated pathways would be much more likely to be kept, as BMP activation would very likely be prevalent.

== Endocannabinoids ==
Research in 2004 has shown that endocannabinoid release from the postsynaptic neuron can inhibit activation of the presynaptic neuron. Type 1 cannabinoid receptors (CB1Rs) are the receptors on the presynaptic neuron responsible for this effect. The specific ligand is thought to be 2-arachidonyl glycerol, or 2-AG. This has mainly been found in GABAergic synapses and thus has been termed inhibitory long term depression (I-LTD). This effect has been found to be extremely localized and accurate, meaning the cannabinoids do not diffuse far from their intended target. This inhibition of inhibitory neurotransmission primes proximal excitatory synapses for future LTP induction and is thus metaplastic in nature.

== Neuronal adaptation mechanism ==
A new mechanism has been proposed that concerns the innate excitability of a neuron. It is quantified by the size of the hyperpolarization in mV due to K+ channels re-opening during an action potential. After any sort of learning task, particularly a classical or operant conditioning task, the amplitude of the K+ hyperpolarization, or "after hyperpolarization (AHP)", is greatly reduced. Over time this AHP will return to normal levels. This normalization does not correlate with a loss of memory but instead a loss of learning potential.
