= William Skaggs =

William Skaggs may refer to:

- William E. Skaggs (died c. 2020), American neuroscientist
- William H. Skaggs (1861–1947), American political figure in Alabama

== See also ==
- Boz Scaggs (born 1944), american singer and songwriter, born William Royce Skaggs
