= Synaptic tagging =

Neuroscience hypothesis

Synaptic tagging, or the synaptic tagging hypothesis, has been proposed to explain how neural signaling at a particular synapse creates a target for subsequent plasticity-related product (PRP) trafficking essential for sustained LTP and LTD. Although the molecular identity of the tags remains unknown, it has been established that they form as a result of high or low frequency stimulation, interact with incoming PRPs, and have a limited lifespan.

Further investigations have suggested that plasticity-related products include mRNA and proteins from both the soma and dendritic shaft that must be captured by molecules within the dendritic spine to achieve persistent LTP and LTD. This idea was articulated in the synaptic tag-and-capture hypothesis. Overall, synaptic tagging elaborates on the molecular underpinnings of how L-LTP is generated and leads to memory formation.

== History ==
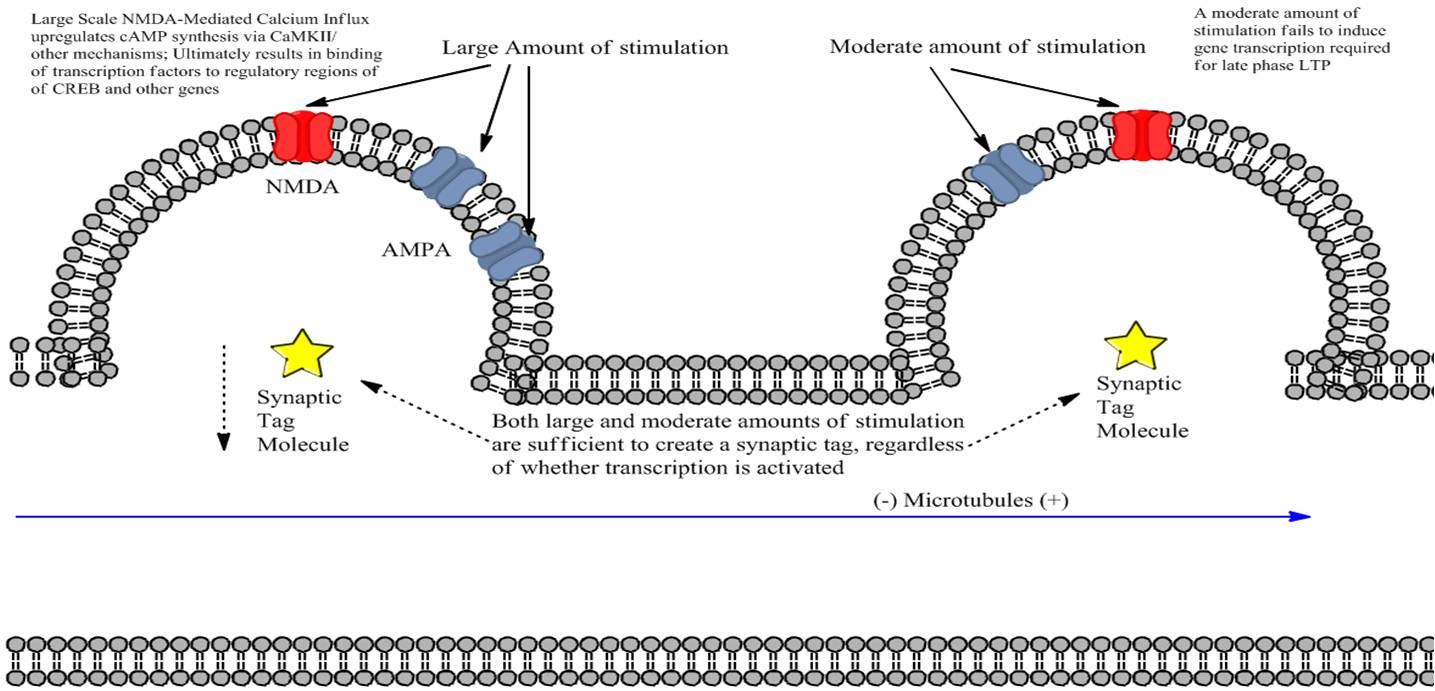
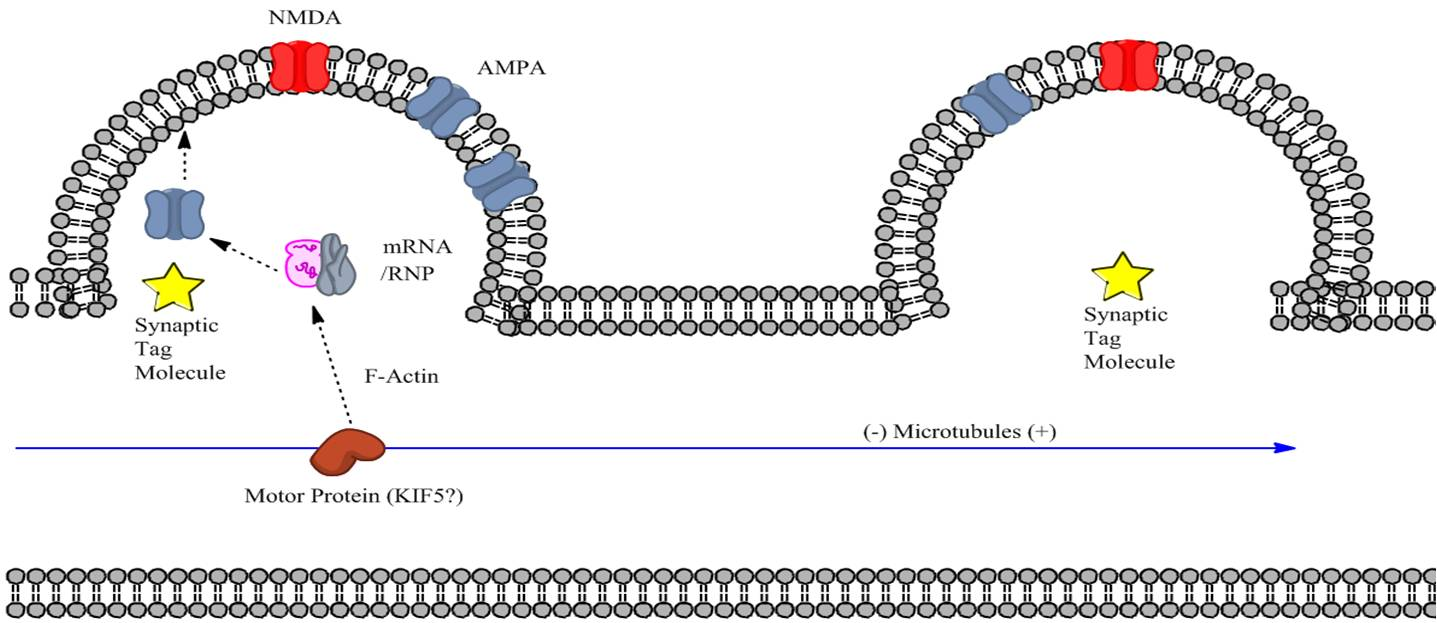
A potential molecular mechanism for synaptic tagging

Frey, a researcher at the Leibniz Institute for Neurobiology (later at the Medical College of Georgia and the Lund University), and Morris, a researcher at the University of Edinburgh, laid the groundwork for the synaptic tagging hypothesis, stating:

"We propose that LTP initiates the creation of a short-lasting protein-synthesis-independent 'synaptic tag' at the potentiated synapse which sequesters the relevant protein(s) to establish late LTP. In support of this idea, we now show that weak tetanic stimulation, which ordinarily leads only to early LTP, or repeated tetanization in the presence of protein-synthesis inhibitors, each results in protein-synthesis-dependent late LTP, provided repeated tetanization has already been applied at another input to the same population of neurons. The synaptic tag decays in less than three hours. These findings indicate that the persistence of LTP depends not only on local events during its induction, but also on the prior activity of the neuron."

L-LTP inducing stimulus induces two independent processes including a dendritic biological tag that identifies the synapse as having been stimulated, and a genomic cascade that produces new mRNAs and proteins (plasticity products). While weak stimulation also tags synapses, it does not produce the cascade. Proteins produced in the cascade are characteristically promiscuous, in that they will attach to any recently tagged synapse. However, as Frey and Morris discovered, the tag is temporary and will disappear if no protein presents itself for capture. Therefore, the tag and protein production must overlap if L-LTP is to be induced by the high-frequency stimulation.

The experiment performed by Frey and Morris involved the stimulation of two different sets of Schaffer collateral fibers that synapsed on same population of CA1 cells. They then recorded field EPSP associated with each stimulus on either S1 or S2 pathways to produce E-LTP and L-LTP on different synapses within the same neuron, based on the intensity of the stimulus. Results showed 1) that E-LTP produced by weak stimulation could be turned into L-LTP if a strong S2 stimulus was delivered before or after and 2)that the ability to convert E-LTP to L-LTP decreased as the interval between the two stimulations increased, creating temporal dependence. When they blocked protein synthesis prior to the delivery of strong S2 stimulation, the conversion to L-LTP was prevented, showing importance of translating the mRNAs produced by the genomic cascade.

Subsequent research has identified an additional property of synaptic tagging that involves associations between late LTP and LTD. This phenomenon was first identified by Sajikumar and Frey in 2004 and is now referred to as "cross-tagging". It involves late-associative interactions between LTP and LTD induced in sets of independent synaptic inputs: late-LTP induced in one set of synaptic inputs can transform early-LTD into late-LTD in another set of inputs. The opposite effect also occurs: early LTP induced in the first synapse can be transformed into late LTP if followed by a late LTD-inducing stimulus in an independent synapse. This phenomenon is seen because the synthesis of nonspecific plasticity related proteins (PRPs) by late-LTP or -LTD in the first synapse is sufficient to transform early-LTD/LTP to late-LTD/LTP in the second synapse after synaptic tags have been set.

Blitzer and his research team proposed a modification to the theory in 2005, stating that the proteins captured by the synaptic tag are actually local proteins that are translated from mRNAs located in the dendrites. This means that mRNAs are not a product of genomic cascade initiated by strong stimulus, but rather, is delivered as a result of continual basal transcription. They proposed that even weakly stimulated synapses that were tagged can accept proteins produced from a strong stimulation nearby despite lacking the genomic cascade.

== mRNA trafficking to the dendritic spine and cytoskeleton ==
Synaptic tagging/ tag-and-capture theory potentially addresses the significant problem of explaining how mRNA, proteins, and other molecules may be specifically trafficked to certain dendritic spines during late phase LTP. It has long been known that the late phase of LTP depends on protein synthesis within the particular dendritic spine, as proven by injecting anisomycin into a dendritic spine and observing the resulting absence of late LTP. To achieve translation within the dendritic spine, neurons must synthesize the mRNA in the nucleus, package it within a ribonucleoprotein complex, initiate transport, prevent translation during transport, and ultimately deliver the RNP complex to the appropriate dendritic spine. These processes span a number of disciplines and synaptic tagging/tag-and-capture cannot explain them all; nevertheless, synaptic tagging likely plays an important role in directing mRNA trafficking to the appropriate dendritic spine and signaling the mRNA-RNP complex to dissociate and enter the dendritic spine.

A cell's identity and the identities of subcellular structures are largely determined by RNA transcripts. Considering this premise, it follows that cellular transcription, trafficking, and translation of mRNA undergo modification at a number of different junctures. Beginning with transcription, mRNA molecules are potentially modified via alternate splicing of exons and introns. The alternate splicing mechanisms allow cells to produce a diverse set of proteins from a single gene within the genome. Recent developments in next-generation sequencing have allowed for greater understanding of the diversity eukaryotic cells achieve through splice variants.

Transcribed mRNA must reach the intended dendritic spine for the spine to express L-LTP. Neurons may transport mRNA to specific dendritic spines in a package along with a transport ribonucleoprotein (RNP) complex; the transport RNP complex is a subtype of an RNA granule. Granules containing two proteins of known importance to synaptic plasticity, CaMKII (Calmodulin-dependent Kinase II) and the immediate early gene Arc, have been identified to associate with a type of the motor protein kinesin, KIF5. Furthermore, there is evidence that polyadenylated mRNA associates with microtubules in mammalian neurons, at least in vitro. Since mRNA transcripts undergo polyadenylation prior to export from the nucleus, this suggests that the mRNA essential for late-phase LTP may travel along the microtubules within the dendritic shaft prior to reaching the dendritic spine.

Once the RNA/RNP complex arrives via motor protein to an area within the vicinity of the specific dendritic spine, it must somehow get “captured” by a process within the dendritic spine. This process likely involves the synaptic tag created by synaptic stimulation of sufficient strength. Synaptic tagging may result in capture of the RNA/RNP complex via any number of possible mechanisms such as:

1. The synaptic tag triggers transient microtubule entry to within the dendritic spine. Recent research has shown that microtubules can transiently enter dendritic spines in an activity-dependent manner. []
2. The synaptic tag triggers the dissociation of the cargo from motor protein and somehow guides it to dynamically formed microfilaments

== Local protein synthesis ==
Since the 1980s, it has become more and more clear that the dendrites contain the ribosomes, proteins, and RNA components to achieve local and autonomous protein translation. Many mRNAs shown to be localized in the dendrites encode proteins known to be involved in LTP, including AMPA receptor and CaMKII subunits, and cytoskeleton-related proteins MAP2 and Arc.

Researchers provided evidence of local synthesis, by examining the distribution of Arc mRNA after selective stimulation of certain synapses of a hippocampal cell. They found that Arc mRNA was localized at the activated synapses, and Arc protein appeared there simultaneously. This suggests that the mRNA was translated locally.

These mRNA transcripts are translated in a cap-dependent manner, meaning they use a "cap" anchoring point to facilitate ribosome attachment to the 5' untranslated region. Eukaryotic initiation factor 4 group (eIF4) members recruit ribosomal subunits to the mRNA terminus, and assembly of the eIF4F initiation complex is a target of translational control: phosphorylation of eIF4F exposes the cap for rapid reloading, quickening the rate-limiting step of translation. It is suggested that eIF4F complex formation is regulated during LTP to increase local translation. In addition, excessive eIF4F complex destabilizes LTP.

Researchers have identified sequences within the mRNA that determine its final destination - called localization elements (LEs), zipcodes, and targeting elements (TEs). These are recognized by RNA binding proteins, of which some potential candidates are MARTA and ZBP1. They recognize the TEs, and this interaction results in formation of ribonucleotide protein (RNP) complexes, which travel along cytoskeleton filaments to the spine with the help of motor proteins. Dendritic TEs have been identified in the untranslated region of several mRNAs, like MAP2 and alphaCaMKII.

== Possible tag models ==
Synaptic tagging is likely to involve the acquisition of molecular maintenance mechanisms by a synapse that would then allow for the conservation of synaptic changes. There are several proposed processes through which synaptic tagging functions. One model suggests that the tag allows for local protein synthesis at the specified synapse that then leads to modifications in synaptic strength. One example of this suggested mechanism involves the anchoring of PKMzeta mRNA to the tagged synapse. This anchor would then restrict the activity of translated PKMzeta, an important plasticity related protein, to this location. A different model proposes that short-term synaptic changes induced by the stimulus are themselves the tag; subsequently delivered or translated protein products act to strengthen this change. For example, the removal of AMPA receptors due to low-frequency stimulation leading to LTD is stabilized by a new protein product that would be inactive at synapses where internalization had not occurred. The tag could also be a latent memory trace, as another model suggests. The activity of proteins would then be required for the memory trace to lead to sustained changes in synaptic strength. According to this model, changes induced by the latent memory trace, such as the growth of new filipodia, are themselves the tag. These tags require protein products for stabilization, synapse formation, and synapse stabilization. Finally, another model proposes that the required molecular products get directed into the appropriate dendritic branches and then find the specific synapses under efficacy modification, by following Ca++ microconcentration gradients through voltage-gated Ca++ channels.

== Behavioral tagging ==
While the concept of the synaptic tagging hypothesis mainly resulted from experiments applying stimulation to synapses, a similar model can be established considering the process of learning in a broader - behavioral - sense. Fabricio Ballarini and colleagues developed this behavioral tagging model by testing spatial object recognition, contextual conditioning, and conditioned taste aversion in rats with weak training. The applied training normally only results in alterations of short-term memory. However, they paired this weak training with a separate, arbitrary behavioral event that is assumed to induce protein synthesis. When the two behavioral events were coupled within a certain time frame, the weak training was sufficient to elicit task-related changes in long-term memory. The researchers believed that the weak training lead to a "learning tag". During the subsequent task, the cleavage of proteins resulted in the formation of long-term memory for this tag. The behavioral tagging model corresponds to the synaptic tagging model. A weak stimulation establishes E-LTP that may serve as the tag used in converting the weak potentiation to the stronger, more persistent L-LTP, once the high-intensity stimulation is applied.
