= SCAG =

SCAG may refer to one of the following:

- Southern California Association of Governments
- Heroin street term. Injected into the veins with a dirty needle
- Sword Coast Adventurer's Guide

== See also ==
- Skag (disambiguation)
