= Retrograde signaling =

Biological process

Retrograde signaling in biology is the process where a signal travels backwards from a target source back to its original source. Neurons use extended axons that are away from the cell body and dendrites, by using retrograde signaling endosomes, communication can occur. This occurrence happens from the distal part of the axon, the signals then travel to the cell body. Typically, the nucleus of a cell is the original source that creates signaling proteins. However, during retrograde signaling, instead of signals leaving the nucleus, they are sent to the nucleus. Particularly, in cell biology, this type of signaling typically occurs between the mitochondria or chloroplast and the nucleus. Signaling molecules from the mitochondria or chloroplast act on the nucleus to affect nuclear gene expression. In this regard, the chloroplast or mitochondria act as a sensor for internal and external stimuli which activate a signaling pathway.

The postsynaptic dendrite (green) and presynaptic neuron (yellow) found in retrograde neurotransmission

In neuroscience, retrograde signaling (or retrograde neurotransmission) refers more specifically to the process by which a retrograde messenger, such as an anandamide or nitric oxide, is released by a postsynaptic dendrite or cell body, and travels "backwards" across a chemical synapse to bind to the axon terminal of a presynaptic neuron.

== In cell biology ==
Retrograde signals are transmitted from plastids to the nucleus in plants and eukaryotic algae, and from mitochondria to the nucleus in most eukaryotes. Retrograde signals are generally considered to convey intracellular signals related to stress and environmental sensing. Many of the molecules associated with retrograde signaling act on modifying the transcription or by directly binding and acting as a transcription factor. The outcomes of these signaling pathways vary by organism and by stimuli or stress. Furthermore, oxylipins are compounds derived from the oxidation of polyunsaturated fatty acids, These compounds are essential in retrograde signaling when redox and hormonal signaling occur resulting in the control of plant development and stress responses.

== Evolution ==
Retrograde signaling is believed to have arisen after endocytosis of the mitochondria and chloroplast occurred billions of years ago. Originally believed to be photosynthetic bacteria, the mitochondria and chloroplast transferred some of their DNA to the membrane protected nucleus. Thus, some of the proteins required for the mitochondria or chloroplast are within the nucleus. This transfer of DNA further required a network of communication to properly respond to external and internal signals that produces requisite proteins.

=== In yeast ===
The first retrograde signaling pathways discovered in yeast was the RTG pathway, the RTG pathway plays an important role in maintaining the metabolic homeostasis of yeast. Under limited resources the mitochondria must maintain the balance of glutamate for the citric acid cycle. Retrograde signaling from the mitochondria initiates production precursor molecules of glutamate to properly balance supplies within the mitochondria. Retrograde signaling can also act to arrest growth if problems are encountered. In Saccharomyces cerevisiae, if the mitochondria fails to develop properly, they will stop growing until the issue is addressed or cell death is induced. This mechanism is vital to maintain homeostasis of the cell and ensure proper function of the mitochondria.

=== In plants ===
Developing chloroplasts control nuclear gene expression through biogenic retrograde signaling. The disruption of chloroplast development affects nuclear expression of thousands of genes along with Repression of Photosynthesis Associated Nuclear Genes (PhANGs). Chloroplast biogenesis is proposed to normally generate stage specific signals that allow cells to progress through distinct steps of photosynthesis differentiation. If the signals are missing, cells are then "stuck" in juvenile states. Thus, resulting in late acting genes not being induced. Observing how juvenile the transcriptome looks depends on where the development is blocked.

One of the most studied retrograde signaling molecules in plants are reactive oxygen species (ROS). These compounds, previously believed to be damaging to the cell, have since been discovered to act as a signaling molecule. Reactive oxygen species are created as a by-product of aerobic respiration and act on genes involved in the stress response. Depending on the stress, reactive oxygen species can act on neighboring cells to initiate a local signal. By doing this, surrounding cells are "primed" to react to the stress because genes involved in a stress response are initiated prior to encountering the stress. The chloroplast can then also act as a sensor for pathogen response and drought. Detection of these stresses in the cell will induce the formation of compounds that then act on the nucleus to produce pathogen resistance genes or drought tolerance.

== In neuroscience ==
Feedback loop found in retrograde neurological signaling

The primary purpose of retrograde neurotransmission is to regulate chemical neurotransmission. For this reason, retrograde neurotransmission allows neural circuits to create feedback loops. Furthermore, retrograde neurotransmission mainly serves to regulate typical, anterograde neurotransmission, rather than to actually distribute any information – it is similar to electrical neurotransmission.

In contrast to conventional (anterograde) neurotransmitters, retrograde neurotransmitters are synthesized in the postsynaptic neuron, and bind to receptors on the axon terminal of the presynaptic neuron. Additionally, retrograde signaling initiates a signaling cascade that focuses on the presynaptic neuron. Once retrograde signaling is initiated, an increase in action potentials begins in the presynaptic neuron, which directly impacts the postsynaptic neuron by increasing the number of its receptors.

Endocannabinoids like anandamide are known to act as retrograde messengers – as is nitric oxide.

Retrograde signaling may also play a role in long-term potentiation (LTP), a proposed mechanism of learning and memory, although this is still controversial.

=== Formal definition of a retrograde neurotransmitter ===
In 2009, Regehr et al. proposed criteria for defining retrograde neurotransmitters. According to their work, a signaling molecule can be considered a retrograde neurotransmitter if it satisfies all of the following criteria:

- The appropriate machinery for synthesizing and releasing the retrograde messenger must be located in the postsynaptic neuron.
- Disrupting the synthesis and/or release of the messenger from the postsynaptic neuron must prevent retrograde signaling.
- The appropriate targets for the retrograde messenger must be located in the presynaptic bouton.
- Disrupting the targets for the retrograde messenger in the presynaptic boutons must eliminate retrograde signaling.
- Exposing the presynaptic bouton to the messenger should mimic retrograde signaling provided the presence of the retrograde messenger is sufficient for retrograde signaling to occur.
- In cases where the retrograde messenger is not sufficient, pairing the other factors with the retrograde signal should mimic the phenomenon.

=== Types of retrograde neurotransmitters ===
The most prevalent endogenous retrograde neurotransmitters are nitric oxide and various endocannabinoids, which are lipophilic ligands.

The retrograde neurotransmitter, nitric oxide (NO), is a soluble gas that can readily diffuse through various cell membranes. Nitric oxide synthase is the enzyme responsible for the synthesis of nitric oxide in various presynaptic cells. Specifically, nitric oxide is known to play a critical role in LTP, which is crucial in memory storage within the hippocampus. Additionally, literature suggests that nitric oxide can act as intracellular messengers in the brain and can also have an effect on the presynaptic glutamatergic and GABAergic synapses.

Utilizing retrograde signaling, endocannabinoids, a type of retrograde neurotransmitter, are activated when they bind to G-protein coupled receptors on the presynaptic terminals of neurons. The activation of endocannabinoids results in the release of particular neurotransmitters at the excitatory and inhibitory synapses of a neuron, ultimately impacting various forms of plasticity.

=== Retrograde signaling in long-term potentiation ===
As it pertains to LTP, retrograde signaling is a hypothesis describing how events prior to LTP may begin in the postsynaptic neuron but be propagated to the presynaptic neuron, even though normal communication across a chemical synapse occurs in a presynaptic to postsynaptic direction. It is used most commonly by those who argue that presynaptic neurons contribute significantly to the expression of LTP.

==== Background ====
Long-term potentiation (LTP) is the persistent increase in the strength of a chemical synapse that lasts from hours to days. It is thought to occur via two temporally separated events, with induction occurring first, followed by expression. Most LTP investigators agree that induction is entirely postsynaptic, whereas others disagree as to whether expression is primarily a presynaptic or postsynaptic event. Some researchers believe that both presynaptic and postsynaptic mechanisms are involved in LTP expression.

Were LTP entirely induced and expressed postsynaptically, there would be no need for the postsynaptic cell to communicate with the presynaptic cell following LTP induction. However, postsynaptic induction combined with presynaptic expression requires that, following induction, the postsynaptic cell communicating with the presynaptic cell. Due to normal synaptic transmission occurring in a presynaptic to postsynaptic direction, postsynaptic to presynaptic communication is considered a form of retrograde transmission.

==== Mechanism ====
The retrograde signaling hypothesis proposes that during the early stages of LTP expression, the postsynaptic cell "sends a message" to the presynaptic cell to notify it that an LTP-inducing stimulus has been received postsynaptically. The general hypothesis of retrograde signaling does not propose a precise mechanism by which this message is sent and received. One mechanism may be that the postsynaptic cell synthesizes and releases a retrograde messenger upon receipt of LTP-inducing stimulation. Another is that it releases a preformed retrograde messenger upon such activation. Additionally, another mechanism includes synapse-spanning proteins becoming altered by LTP-inducing stimuli in the postsynaptic cell, and that changes the conformation of these proteins which propagates this information across the synapse and to the presynaptic cell.

==== Identity of the messenger ====
Of these mechanisms, the retrograde messenger hypothesis has received the most attention. Among proponents of the model, there is disagreement over the identity of the retrograde messenger. An abundant amount of work was completed in the early 1990s to demonstrate the existence of a retrograde messenger and to determine its identity. Furthermore, the completed work resulted in a generated list of candidates including carbon monoxide, platelet-activating factor, arachidonic acid, and nitric oxide. Nitric oxide has received a great deal of attention in the past, but has recently been superseded by adhesion proteins that span the synaptic cleft to join the presynaptic and postsynaptic cells. The endocannabinoids anandamide and/or 2-AG, acting through G-protein coupled cannabinoid receptors, may play an important role in retrograde signaling through LTP.
