= Early long-term potentiation =

Early long-term potentiation (E-LTP) is the first phase of long-term potentiation (LTP), a well-studied form of synaptic plasticity, and consists of an increase in synaptic strength. LTP could be produced by repetitive stimulation of the presynaptic terminals, and it is believed to play a role in memory function in the hippocampus, amygdala and other cortical brain structures in mammals.

Long-term potentiation occurs when synaptic transmission becomes more effective as a result of recent activity. The neuronal changes can be temporary and wear off after some hours (early LTP) or much more stable and long-lasting (late LTP).

== Early and late phase ==
It has been proposed that long-term potentiation is composed of at least two different phases: protein synthesis-independent E-LTP (early LTP) and protein synthesis-dependent L-LTP (late LTP). A single train of high-frequency stimuli is needed to trigger E-LTP that begins right after the stimulation, lasting a few hours or less, and depending primarily on short-term kinase activity. Contrarily stronger stimulation protocols are needed to recruit L-LTP that begins after a few hours, lasts for at least eight hours, and depends on the activation of de novo gene transcription. These different characteristics suggest a relationship between E-LTP and short-term memory phase, as well as L-LTP and long-term memory phase.

=== LTP and memory phases ===
A comparison between LTP induced by two spaced trains of stimuli and LTP induced by four trains in wild-type mice showed that LTP induced by two trains decays faster than the one induced by one train and slower than the one induced by four trains. Moreover, the LTP induced by two trains is only partially impaired by protein kinase A (PKA) inhibition and not by protein synthesis inhibition. These findings suggested that there is a PKA-dependent phase of LTP intermediate to E-LTP and L-LTP, which was called intermediate LTP (I-LTP).

In the transgenic mice, on the other hand, LTP induced by two trains decayed faster than in wild-type mice, implying that excessive calcineurin activity suppresses both I-LTP and L-LTP. This calcineurin-overexpression could be associated to memory-related behavioral deficits. The transgenic mice performed poorly in spatial memory tasks compared to wild-type mice, indicating a deficit. However, when trained more intensively their performance deficit with respect to wild-type mice disappears. Moreover, the transgenic mice performed normally on memory tasks 30 minutes after training, but were considerably impaired 24 hours after training. This led to the conclusion that calcineurin-overexpressing mice have a deficit in long-term memory consolidation, which reflects their deficit in late phase LTP.

== Biological processes ==
Training of simple reflexes in Aplysia has shown a strengthening between sensory and motor neurons responsible for those reflexes; on a cellular level, for short-term memory (and thus, early LTP) potentiation leads to an increase in presynaptic neurotransmitter by means of modifications of proteins through cAMP-dependent PKA and PKC. The long-term process requires new protein synthesis and CAMP-mediated gene expression, and results in the growth of new synaptic connections.

These findings have led to the question whether there is a similar process in mammals. Input to the hippocampus comes from the neurons of the entorhinal cortex by means of the perforant pathway, which synapses on the granule cells of the dentate gyrus. The granule cells in turn send their axons, the mossy fibre pathway (CA3), to synapse on the pyramidal cells of the CA3 region. Finally, the axons of the pyramidal cells in the CA3 regions, the Schaffer collateral pathway (CA1), terminate on the pyramidal cells of the CA1 region. Damage to any of these hippocampal pathways is sufficient to cause some memory disturbance in humans.

In the perforant and Schaffer pathways, LTP is induced by activating a postsynaptic NMDA receptor, causing an influx of calcium. In the mossy fibres pathway on the other hand, LTP is induced presynaptically through an influx of glutamate.

=== E-LTP and classical conditioning ===
Early LTP is best studied in the context of classical conditioning. As the signal of an unconditioned stimulus enters the pontine nuclei in the brainstem, the signal travels through the mossy fibres to the interpositus nucleus and the parallel fibres in the cerebellum. The parallel fibres synapse on so called Purkinje cells, which simultaneously receive input of the unconditioned stimulus via the inferior olives and climbing fibres.

The parallel fibres release glutamate, which activates inhibitory metabotropic and excitatory ionotropic AMPA receptors. The metabotropic receptors activate an enzyme cascade via G protein, which leads to the activation of protein kinase C (PKC). This PKC phosphorylates the active ionotropic receptors.

At another place of the cell, the climbing fibres carry the neurotransmitter aspartate to the Purkinje cell, and that leads to the opening of calcium channels, which in turn causes an increased influx of calcium to the cell. The calcium activates PKC once again, and the phosphorylised ionotropic receptors are internalised. Thus, the surplus of metabotropic receptors hyperpolarises the cell, and the interpositus nucleus depolarises the inferior olives, which causes a decrease in expectation of the unconditioned stimulus and therefore causing an inhibition in early LTP or a period of long-term depression.

== Clinical perspectives ==
=== LTP in Alzheimer's disease ===
Alzheimer's disease is generally characterized by extracellular deposits of neurotoxic amyloid peptides (Aβ), intracellular aggregation of hyper-phosphorylated tau protein, and neuronal death. Whereas chronic stress is characterized by its negative impacts on the effect of learning and memory and furthermore can exacerbate a number of disorders, including Alzheimer's disease (AD).

Previous studies have shown that the combination of chronic psychosocial stress and chronic infusion of a pathogenic dose of Aβ peptides impairs learning and memory and severely diminishes early phase long-term potentiation (E-LTP) in the hippocampal area CA1 of anesthetized rat.

Chronic psychosocial stress was produced using a rat intruder model and the at-risk rat model of Alzheimer's disease was created by osmotic pump infusion of sub-pathological dose of Aβ (subAβ). Electrophysiological methods were used to evoke and record early and late phase LTP in the dentate gyrus of anesthetized rats, and immunoblotting was used to measure levels of memory-related signaling molecules in the same region. These Electrophysiological and molecular tests in the dentate gyrus showed that subAβ rats or stressed rats were not different from control rats. However, the present findings conclude that when stress and subAβ are combined, significant suppression of E-LTP magnitude results.

In summary, although the CA1 and DG regions are closely related physically and functionally, they react differently to insults. While the area CA1 is vulnerable to stress and the combination stress/subAβ, the DG is remarkably resistant to the offending combination of subAβ and chronic stress.

=== LTP in drug use ===
Another use of LTP is in drug abuse. As can be seen in many drug victims, conditioning plays a vital role in building up a tolerance. In reconditioning recovering addicts to the place in which they used to take drugs with a different stimulus, the craving they feel could be counteracted. A rather successful experimental study has shown that this paradigm lowers the danger of relapsing and works as extinction.

== Alternative models ==
The hypothesis that the stabilisation of synaptic plasticity depends on de novo protein synthesis is widely discussed in the literature. The temporal differentiation between early and late LTP is also based on this. Early LTP is associated with short-term memory and late LTP with long-term memory. Behavioural studies raised evidence against this differentiation.

Studies with protein synthesis inhibitors showed that blocking protein synthesis did not block memory retention. Stable LTP were found in slice preparation of the hippocampus under a state of global protein synthesis inhibition. Those studies show that LTP stabilization can happen independently from protein synthesis. These findings suggest that the association between protein synthesis and stabilization alone may be insufficient to distinguish between early and late LTP.

Instead of the differentiation into early and late LTP and protein synthesis as the driving force for LTP and memory stabilization, an alternative model was proposed: in addition to the protein synthesis, the protein degradation also determines the stabilization, so the turn-over rate of proteins is said to underlie LTP stabilization. According to the model, the differentiation into temporal phases of LTP is inappropriate and even hindering to future research about LTP. Mechanisms can be overlooked due to the closed temporalization of function and processes.
