= Skag (disambiguation) =

Skag is an American television series starring Karl Malden.

Skag may also refer to:

- Skeg, also spelled ⟨skag⟩, the stern ward extension of the keel of some boats and ships
- Hacaritama Airport, by ICAO code
- Heroin

== See also ==
- Skaggs (disambiguation)
