= Scaggs =

Scaggs is a surname. Notable people with the surname include:

- Austin Scaggs (born 1978), American music critic
- Boz Scaggs (born 1944), American singer, songwriter and guitarist
- Noelle Scaggs (born 1979), American singer-songwriter

== See also ==
- Skaggs (disambiguation)
