= Long-term potentiation induction =

Concept in neuroscience

The induction of NMDA receptor-dependent long-term potentiation (LTP) in chemical synapses in the brain occurs via a fairly straightforward mechanism. A substantial and rapid rise in calcium ion concentration inside the postsynaptic cell (or more specifically, within the dendritic spine) is most possibly all that is required to induce LTP. However, the mechanism of calcium delivery to the postsynaptic cell in inducing LTP is more complicated.

== The role of the AMPA receptor ==
The AMPA receptor (AMPAR) is the engine that drives excitatory postsynaptic potentials (EPSPs). While some forms of the AMPAR can conduct calcium, most AMPARs found in the neocortex do not. The AMPAR, upon binding two glutamate molecules, undergoes a conformational change that resembles the opening of a clam shell. This conformational change opens an ion channel within the AMPAR protein structure that allows sodium ions to flow into the cell and potassium ions to flow out (i.e. it is a mixed cation-conducting channel). The Na^{+} and K^{+} permeabilities of the AMPAR channel are roughly equal, so when this channel is open the resulting change in membrane potential tends towards zero (a bit more than halfway between the equilibrium potentials E_{K} and E_{Na}). This balance point is reached at around 0 mV (i.e. the reversal potential of the EPSP current is roughly 0 mV). However, the postsynaptic membrane potential will not change by more than a few millivolts from resting potential with a single presynaptic release of glutamate, because not many AMPAR channels open. The lifetime of the glutamate in the synaptic cleft is too short to allow more than a brief opening of the AMPAR channel, thus causing only a small depolarization. The open AMPAR channel is often considered to be non-calcium permeable, but this is only an approximation as AMPARs with certain subunit compositions will allow calcium through, albeit at different levels and frequency to NMDARs.

Historically, the most widely used experimental means of inducing LTP has been to deliver a tetanic stimulation to the presynaptic axon of a synapse or group of synapses. The frequency of this tetanus is typically 100 Hz, and the duration typically 1 s. A single AMPAR-mediated EPSP has a rise time-to-peak of approximately 2–5 ms and a duration of approximately 30 ms. If a synapse is being stimulated at 100 Hz, the presynaptic neuron will be attempting to release glutamate once every 10 ms. An EPSP occurring only 10 ms after a previous EPSP will arrive at a time when that previous EPSP is at its peak amplitude. Thus, during a 100 Hz stimulus train, each EPSP will add to the membrane depolarization caused by the previous EPSPs. This synaptic summation drives the membrane potential toward values that could not be reached with single synaptic stimuli. As the EPSPs summate, they will exceed the spike threshold.

== The role of the NMDA receptor ==
The NMDA receptor (NMDAR) does not, in resting or near-resting membrane potential conditions, contribute significant current to the EPSP. Following the presynaptic release of the glutamate that binds to and opens the AMPAR, the NMDAR also binds this glutamate and opens. However, current does not flow through the NMDAR ion channel because it is instantaneously blocked by a magnesium ion (Mg^{2+}) that binds to a site "inside" the open pore of the NMDAR channel. Magnesium has access to this binding site only when the NMDAR channel is opened by glutamate binding, a so-called open channel block.

=== Magnesium blockade ===
What makes this magnesium blockade of the NMDAR channel particularly significant in terms of LTP induction is that the block is membrane voltage-dependent. The basis of this voltage dependence is relatively straightforward. The NMDAR channel is a transmembrane protein; that is, it spans the cell membrane. As such, it also spans the electric field generated by the membrane potential. The magnesium binding site within the NMDAR channel is physically located within this electric field. Magnesium ions carrying a double positive charge can be acted upon by the field. When the cell is hyperpolarized, magnesium is stabilized inside the channel (i.e. the two positive charges on the magnesium ion are attracted toward the negative pole of the electric field, which points toward the inside of the cell). As a cell is depolarized, the field effect on the magnesium ion weakens, and the dwell time of magnesium ions within the channel decreases. Thus, the kinetics of the binding reaction between magnesium and the NMDAR channel are such that magnesium periodically unbinds and leaves the channel, only to be replaced by another magnesium ion. During the (very brief) time that the magnesium is absent from the open channel, other ions (such as sodium and calcium) can flow through the channel. However, when the cell is more hyperpolarized, the bound state of magnesium is stabilized and it leaves the channel less often and for a shorter period of time (on average). When the cell is less hyperpolarized, the magnesium leaves the channel more often and stays away for longer (on average). Hence, the magnesium blockade of the open NMDAR channel is membrane voltage-dependent.

While the NMDAR channel itself displays little or no voltage dependence (its open channel I/V curve is more or less linear), the voltage dependence of the magnesium block effectively, if indirectly, confers voltage dependence to this channel. Thus, in effect, the NMDAR channel is both a ligand-gated and voltage-gated channel at the same time. This fact is critical to the function of the NMDAR as a Hebbian coincidence detector. More strictly speaking, inward cationic current (sodium or calcium) through the open unblocked NMDAR does decrease with depolarization (because of the decreased electrochemical "driving force"), but the voltage-dependent unblocking seems to outweigh this decrease in driving force, so the calcium influx into the spine caused by a pair of appropriately timed pre- and postsynaptic spikes significantly exceeds the sum of the influxes due to the individual spikes alone. This extra, or "nonlinear", calcium entry triggers the strength change.
