= William E. Skaggs =

American neuroscientist

- Education: University of Arizona
- Scientific career
- Fields: neurophysiology, behavioral neuroscience, computational neuroscience
- Workplaces: University of California, Davis
- Thesis: Relations between the theta rhythm and activity patterns of hippocampal neurons (1995)
- Doctoral advisor: Bruce McNaughton
- Other academic advisors: Carol A. Barnes

William E. Skaggs was an American neuroscientist. He is noted for his work on the functioning of the hippocampus.

== Education ==
Skaggs obtained his PhD in 1995 under the direction of Bruce McNaughton at the University of Arizona.

== Scholarship ==
Skaggs was a faculty member at the University of California, Davis, where he conducted research on neurophysiology in primates, often using computational neuroscience. He was noted particularly for his elucidation of the role of theta waves in the function of the hippocampus, via their role in phase precession and firing replay. This work led to a greater understanding of memory, learning, and navigation through space.

He was also a science writer who helped popularize scientific concepts for a general audience. In this role, he contributed to the Scientific American and was an editor at Wikipedia, under the name Looie496.

A special issue of the journal Behavioral Neuroscience was dedicated to Skaggs in 2020, noting that he had died from a heart attack.

== Publications ==
Google Scholar lists more than 40 publications that, together, have been cited over 10,000 times (three of them over 1000 times each), giving Skaggs an h-index of 26. His most-cited papers are:

1. Skaggs, William E.; McNaughton, Bruce L.; Wilson, Matthew A.; Barnes, Carol A. (1996). "Theta phase precession in hippocampal neuronal populations and the compression of temporal sequences". Hippocampus. 6 (2): 149–172. doi:10.1002/(SICI)1098-1063(1996)6:2<149::AID-HIPO6>3.0.CO;2-K. PMID 8797016. S2CID 15813385. (>1800 citations)
2. Skaggs, William E.; McNaughton, Bruce L. (29 March 1996). "Replay of neuronal firing sequences in rat hippocampus during sleep following spatial experience". Science. 271 (5257): 1870–1873. Bibcode:1996Sci...271.1870S. doi:10.1126/science.271.5257.1870. PMID 8596957. S2CID 23694471. (>1300 citations)
3. McNaughton, B. L.; Barnes, C. A.; Gerrard, J. L.; Gothard, K.; Jung, M. W.; Knierim, J. J.; Kudrimoti, H.; Qin, Y.; Skaggs, W. E.; Suster, M.; Weaver, K. L. (1 January 1996). "Deciphering the Hippocampal Polyglot: the hippocampus as a path integration system". Journal of Experimental Biology. 199 (1): 173–185. doi:10.1242/jeb.199.1.173. PMID 8576689. (>1000 citations)
