= Skaggs =

Skaggs may refer to:

- Skaggs Companies, predecessors to many famous United States retailing chains, including Safeway, Albertsons, Osco, and Longs Drug Stores
- Skaggs family, a family prominent in merchandising
- Skaggs School of Pharmacy, the pharmacy school of the University of California, San Diego

== People ==
- Charlie Skaggs (born 1965), American professional wrestler best known as 2 Cold Scorpio
- Dave Skaggs (born 1951), former Major League Baseball catcher
- David Skaggs (born 1943), Democratic Congressman from the state of Colorado
- David Curtis Skaggs, Jr. (born 1937), American historian
- Hazel Ghazarian Skaggs (1920–2005) American author and composer
- Henry Skaggs (1724–1810), American longhunter, explorer and pioneer
- Jim Skaggs (born 1940), former professional American football offensive lineman
- Jimmie F. Skaggs (1944–2004), American actor
- Joey Skaggs (born 1945), American prankster who organizes media pranks
- Justin Skaggs (1979–2007), American football player
- Luther Skaggs, Jr. (1923–1976), United States Marine during World War II
- Marion Barton Skaggs (1888–1976), American businessman
- Ricky Skaggs (born 1954), Grammy-winning country and bluegrass singer, musician, producer, and composer
- Trent Skaggs (born 1973), businessman
- Tyler Skaggs (1991–2019), American baseball player
- William H. Skaggs (1861–1947), American politician

== See also ==
- Scaggs (disambiguation)
