= Károly Schaffer =

Hungarian anatomist and neurologist

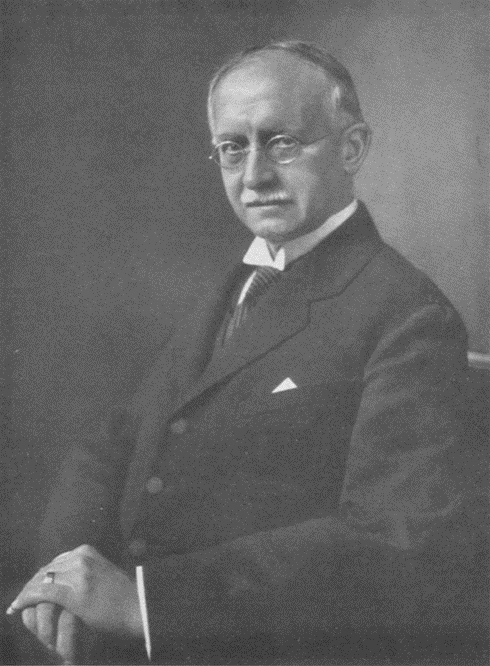
- Károly Schaffer
- Born: September 7, 1864; Vienna
- Died: October 16, 1939 (aged 75)
- Scientific career
- Fields: anatomy neurology

Károly Schaffer (September 7, 1864, Vienna – October 16, 1939, Budapest) was a Hungarian anatomist and neurologist. He was born in Vienna. The axon projection from CA3 to CA1 neurons in hippocampus, Schaffer collateral, is named after him.

He was involved in the early studies of Tay–Sachs disease.

== Authored books ==
- Über das morphologische Wesen und die Histopathologie der hereditär-systematischen Nervenkrankheiten (Berlin, 1926)
- Az elmebetegségek és kapcsolatos idegbetegségek kórtana (Pathology of mental diseases and their related nervous disorders. Budapest, 1927)
- Anatomische Wesenbestimmung der hereditär-organischen Nerven-Geisteskrankheiten (With Dezsö Miskolczy. Szeged, 1936)
- Histopathologie des Neurons (Budapest-Leipzig, 1938)
