= Activity-dependent plasticity =

Neuroplasticity that arise from use of cognitive functions

Activity-dependent plasticity is a form of functional and structural neuroplasticity that arises from the use of cognitive functions and personal experience. Hence, it is the biological basis for learning and the formation of new memories. Activity-dependent plasticity is a form of neuroplasticity that arises from intrinsic or endogenous activity, as opposed to forms of neuroplasticity that arise from extrinsic or exogenous factors, such as electrical brain stimulation- or drug-induced neuroplasticity. The brain's ability to remodel itself forms the basis of the brain's capacity to retain memories, improve motor function, and enhance comprehension and speech amongst other things. It is this trait to retain and form memories that is associated with neural plasticity and therefore many of the functions individuals perform on a daily basis. This plasticity occurs as a result of changes in gene expression which are triggered by signaling cascades that are activated by various signaling molecules (e.g., calcium, dopamine, and glutamate, among many others) during increased neuronal activity.

The brain's ability to adapt toward active functions allows humans to specialize in specific processes based on relative use and activity. For example, a right-handed person may perform any movement poorly with their left hand but continuous practice with the non-dominant hand can cause one to become ambidextrous.

== History ==
The idea of neural plasticity was first proposed during 1890 by William James in Principles of Psychology. During the first half of the 1900s, the word 'plasticity' was directly and indirectly rejected throughout science. Many scientists found it hard to receive funding because nearly everyone unanimously supported the fact that the brain was fully developed at adulthood and specific regions were unable to change functions after the critical period. It was believed that each region of the brain had a set and specific function. Despite this, several pioneers pushed the idea of plasticity through means of various experiments and research. There are others that helped to the current progress of activity-dependent plasticity but the following contributed very effective results and ideas early on.

=== Pioneers of activity-dependent plasticity ===
The history of activity-dependent plasticity began with Paul Bach y Rita. With conventional ideology, being that the brain development is finalized upon adulthood, Bach y Rita designed several experiments in the late 1960s and 1970s that proved that the brain is capable of changing. These included a pivotal visual substitution method for blind people provided by tactile image projection in 1969. The basis behind this experiment was to take one sense and use it to detect another: in this case use the sense of touch on the tongue to visualize the surrounding. This experiment was years ahead of its time and led to many questions and applications. A similar experiment was reported again by Bach y Rita in 1986 where vibrotactile stimulation was delivered to the index fingertips of naive blindfolded subjects. Even though the experiment did not yield great results, it supported the study and proposed further investigations. In 1998, his design was even further developed and tested again with a 49-point electrotactile stimulus array on the tongue. He found that five sighted adult subjects recognized shapes across all sizes 79.8% of the time, a remarkable finding that has led to the incorporation of the tongue electrotactile stimulus into cosmetically acceptable and practical designs for blind people. In later years, he has published a number of other articles including "Seeing with the brain" in 2003 where Bach y Rita addresses the plasticity of the brain relative to visual learning. Here, images are enhanced and perceived by other plastic mechanisms within the realm of information passing to the brain.

Another pioneer within the field of activity-dependent plasticity is Michael Merzenich, currently a professor in neuroscience at the University of California, San Francisco. One of his contributions includes mapping out and documenting the reorganization of cortical regions after alterations due to plasticity. While assessing the recorded changes in the primary somatosensory cortex of adult monkeys, he looked at several features of the data including how altered schedules of activity from the skin remap to cortical modeling and other factors that affect the representational remodeling of the brain. His findings within these studies have since been applied to youth development and children with language-based learning impairments. Through many studies involving adaptive training exercises on computer, he has successfully designed methods to improve their temporal processing skills. These adaptive measures include word-processing games and comprehension tests that involve multiple regions of the brain in order to answer. The results later translated into his development of the Fast ForWord program in 1996, which aims to enhance cognitive skills of children between kindergarten and twelfth grade by focusing on developing "phonological awareness". It has proven very successful at helping children with a variety of cognitive complications. In addition, it has led to in depth studies of specific complications such as autism and intellectual disability and the causes of them. Alongside a team of scientists, Merzenich helped to provide evidence that autism probes monochannel perception where a stronger stimulus-driven representation dominates behavior and weaker stimuli are practically ignored in comparison.

== Structure of neurons ==
Diagram displaying components of a myelinated vertebrate motorneuron.

Neurons are the basic functional unit of the brain and process and transmit information through signals. Many different types of neurons can be identified based on their function, such as sensory neurons or motor neurons. Each responds to specific stimuli and sends respective and appropriate chemical signals to other neurons. The basic structure of a neuron is shown here on the right and consists of a nucleus that contains genetic information; the cell body, or the soma, which is equipped with dendritic branches that mostly receive the incoming inputs from other neurons; a long, thin axon that bears axon terminals which carry the output information to other neurons. The dendrites and axons are interfaced through a small connection called a synapse. This component of the neuron contains a variety of chemical messengers and proteins that allow for the transmission of information. It is the variety of proteins and effect of the signal that fundamentally lead to the plasticity feature.

== Structures and molecular pathways involved ==
Activity-dependent plasticity of one form or another has been observed in most areas of the brain. In particular, it is thought that the reorganization of sensory and motor maps involves a variety of pathways and cellular structures related to relative activity.

Many molecules have been implicated in synaptic plasticity. Notably, AMPA and NMDA receptors are key molecules in mechanisms of long and short-term potentiation between neurons. NMDA receptors can detect local activity due to activation and therefore modify signaling in the post-synaptic cell. The increased activity and coordination between pre- and post-synaptic receptors leads to more permanent changes and therefore result in plasticity. Hebb's postulate addresses this fact by stating that synaptic terminals are strengthened by correlated activity and will therefore sprout new branches. However, terminals that experience weakened and minimal activity will eventually lose their synaptic connection and deteriorate.

A major target of all molecular signaling is the inhibitory connections made by GABAergic neurons. These receptors exist at postsynaptic sites and along with the regulation of local inhibitory synapses have been found to be very sensitive to critical period alterations. Any alteration to the receptors leads to changed concentrations of calcium in the affected cells and can ultimately influence dendritic and axonal branching. This concentration change is the result of many kinases being activated, the byproduct of which may enhance specific gene expression.

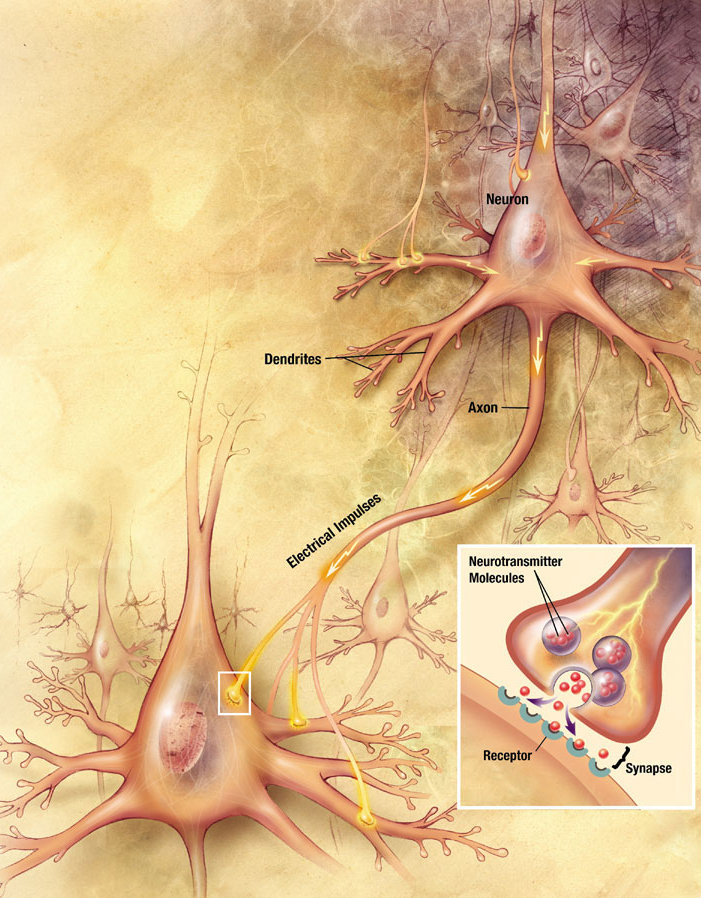
Illustration of the elements incorporated in synaptic transmission. An action potential is generated and travels down the axon to the axon terminal, where it is released and provokes a neurotransmitter release that acts on the post-synaptic end.

In addition, it has been identified that the Wg postsynaptic pathway, which is responsible for the coding and production of many molecules for development events, can be bidirectionally stimulated and is responsible for the downstream alteration of the postsynaptic neuron. When the Wg presynaptic pathway is activated, however, it alters cytoskeletal structure through transcription and translation.

Cell adhesion molecules (CAMs) are also important in plasticity as they help coordinate the signaling across the synapse. More specifically, integrins, which are receptors for extracellular matrix proteins and involved with CAMs, are explicitly incorporated in synapse maturation and memory formation. They play a crucial role in the feedback regulation of excitatory synaptic strength, or long-term potentiation (LTP), and help to control synaptic strength by regulating AMPA receptors, which result in quick, short synaptic currents. But, it is the metabotropic glutamate receptor 1 (mGlu1) that has been discovered to be required for activity-dependent synaptic plasticity in associative learning.

Activity-dependent plasticity is seen in the primary visual cortex, a region of the brain that processes visual stimuli and is capable of modifying the experienced stimuli based on active sensing and arousal states. It is known that synaptic communication trends between excited and depressed states relative to the light/dark cycle. By experimentation on rats, it was found that visual experience during vigilant states leads to increased responsiveness and plastic changes in the visual cortex. More so, depressed states were found to negatively alter the stimulus so the reaction was not as energetic. This experiment proves that even the visual cortex is capable of achieving activity-dependent plasticity as it is reliant on both visual exploration and the arousal state of the animal.

== Role in learning ==
Activity-dependent plasticity plays a very important role in learning and in the ability of understanding new things. It is responsible for helping to adapt an individual's brain according to the relative amount of usage and functioning. In essence, it is the brain's ability to retain and develop memories based on activity-driven changes of synaptic strength that allow stronger learning of information. It is thought to be the growing and adapting quality of dendritic spines that provide the basis for synaptic plasticity connected to learning and memory. Dendritic spines accomplish this by transforming synaptic input into neuronal output and also by helping to define the relationship between synapses.

In recent studies, a specific gene has also been identified as having a strong role in synapse growth and activity-dependent plasticity: the microRNA 132 gene (miR132). This gene is regulated by the cAMP response element-binding (CREB) protein pathway and is capable of enhancing dendritic growth when activated. The miR132 gene is another component that is responsible for the brain's plasticity and helps to establish stronger connections between neurons.

Another plasticity-related gene involved in learning and memory is Arc/Arg3.1. The Arc gene is activity-regulated and the transcribed mRNA is localized to activated synaptic sites where the translated protein plays a role in AMPA receptor trafficking. Arc is a member of a class of proteins called immediate early genes (IEG) that are rapidly transcribed in response to synaptic input. Of the estimated 30-40 genes that comprise the total neuronal IEG response, all are prototypical activity-dependent genes and a number have been implicated in learning and memory. For example, zif268, Arc, beta-activin, tPA, Homer, and COX-2 have all been implicated in long-term potentiation (LTP), a cellular correlate of learning and memory.

According to natural neurostimulation theory, physical interactions with the mother during pregnancy promote activity-dependent plasticity in the fetal nervous system, with the mother's heart playing a central role. This theory explains how electromagnetic and acoustic oscillations of the mother's heart shape an ensemble of neuronal activity across both nervous systems. During the mother's intentional act with her environment, specifically the acoustic environment shared with the fetus in the low-frequency sound band, the brainwave entrainment provides clues to the fetus's nervous system, linking neuronal activity with relevant stimuli. This neural synchrony enables cooperative interactions between the mature (mother) and naive (fetus) organisms and the environment, ensuring that the naive organism gains positive or negative valence from stimuli. It is thought that this evolutionary mechanism, of the nervous system growth through activity-dependent plasticity, provides cognitive development in the fetus with no prior experience, enabling it to begin categorizing the world by the positive/negative valence of stimuli.

== Mechanisms involved ==
There are a variety of mechanisms involved in activity-dependent plasticity. These include LTP, long-term depression (LTD), synaptic elimination, neurogenesis, and synaptogenesis. The mechanisms of activity-dependent plasticity result in membrane depolarization and calcium influx, which in turn trigger cellular changes that affect synaptic connections and gene transcription. In essence, neuronal activity regulates gene expression related to dendritic branching and synapse development. Mutations in activity-dependent transcription-related genes can lead to neurological disorders. Each of the studies' findings aims to help proper development of the brain while improving a wide variety of tasks such as speech, movement, comprehension, and memory. More so, the findings better explain the development induced by plasticity.

It is known that during postnatal life a critical step to nervous system development is synapse elimination. The changes in synaptic connections and strength are results from LTP and LTD and are strongly regulated by the release of brain-derived neurotrophic factor (BDNF), an activity-dependent synapse-development protein. In addition to BDNF, Nogo-66 receptors, and more specifically NgR1, are also involved in the development and regulation of neuronal structure. Damage to this receptor leads to pointless LTP and attenuation of LTD. Both situations imply that NgR1 is a regulator of synaptic plasticity. From experiments, it has been found that stimulation inducing LTD leads to a reduction in synaptic strength and loss of connections but, when coupled simultaneously with low-frequency stimulation, helps the restructuring of synaptic contacts. The implications of this finding include helping people with receptor damage and providing insight into the mechanism behind LTP.

Another research model of activity-dependent plasticity includes the excitatory corticostriatal pathway that is involved in information processing related to adaptive motor behaviors and displays long-lasting synaptic changes. The change in synaptic strength is responsible for motor learning and is dependent on the simultaneous activation of glutamatergic corticostriatal and dopaminergic nigrostriatal pathways. These are the same pathways affected in Parkinson's disease, and the degeneration of synapses within this disorder may be responsible for the loss of some cognitive abilities.

== Relationship to behavior ==
=== Intellectual disability ===
Since plasticity is such a fundamental property of brain function due to its involvement in brain development, brain repair, and cognitive processes, its proper regulation is necessary for normal physiology. Mutations within any of the genes associated with activity-dependent plasticity have been found to positively correlate with various degrees of intellectual disability. The two types of intellectual disability related to plasticity depend on dysfunctional neuronal development or alterations in molecular mechanisms involved in synaptic organization. Complications within either of these types can greatly reduce brain capability and comprehension.

=== Stroke rehabilitation ===
On the other hand, people with such conditions have the capacity to recover some degree of their lost abilities through continued challenges and use. An example of this can be seen in Norman Doidge's The Brain That Changes Itself. Bach y Rita's father had a disabling stroke that left the 65-year-old man half-paralyzed and unable to speak. After one year of crawling and unusual therapy tactics including playing basic children's games and washing pots, his father's rehabilitation was nearly complete and he went back to his role as a professor at City College in New York. This remarkable recovery from a stroke proves that even someone with abnormal behavior and severe medical complications can recover nearly all of the normal functions by much practice and perseverance.

Recent studies have reported that a specific gene, FMR1, is highly involved in activity-dependent plasticity and fragile X syndrome (FraX) is the result of this gene's loss of function. The FMR1 gene produces protein FMRP, which mediates activity-dependent control of synaptic structure. The loss or absence of this gene almost certainly leads to both autism and intellectual disability. Dr. Gatto has found that early introduction of the product FMRP results in nearly complete restructuring of the synapses. This method is not as effective, though, when introduced into a mature subject and only partially accommodates for the losses of FMR1. The discovery of this gene provides a possible location for intervention for young children with these abnormalities as this gene and its product act early to construct synaptic architecture.

=== Stress ===
A common issue amongst most people in the United States is high levels of stress and also disorders associated with continuous stress. Many regions of the brain are very sensitive to stress and can be damaged with extended exposure. More importantly, many of the mechanisms involved with increased memory retention, comprehension, and adaptation are thought to involve LTP and LTD, two activity-dependent plasticity mechanisms that stress can directly suppress. Several experiments have been conducted in order to discover the specific mechanisms for this suppression and also possible intervention methods. Dr. Li and several others have actually identified the TRPV1 channel as a target to facilitate LTP and suppress LTD, therefore helping to protect the feature of synaptic plasticity and retention of memory from the effects of stress.

== Future studies ==
The future studies and questions for activity-dependent plasticity are nearly endless because the implications of the findings will enable many treatments. Despite many gains within the field, there are a wide variety of disorders that further understanding of activity-dependent mechanisms of plasticity would help treat and perhaps cure. These include autism, different severities of intellectual disability, schizophrenia, Parkinson's disease, stress, and stroke. In addition to a better understanding of the various disorders, neurologists should and will look at the plasticity incurred by the immune system, as it will provide great insight into diseases and also give the basis of new immune-centered therapeutics. A better perspective of the cellular mechanisms that regulate neuronal morphology is the next step to discovering new treatments for learning and memory pathological conditions.

== See also ==
- Central nervous system
- Chemical synapse
- Dendritic spine
- Hebbian theory
- Neuroplasticity
- Sensory substitution
- Spike-timing-dependent plasticity
