= Schaffer collateral =

Schaffer collaterals are axon collaterals given off by CA3 pyramidal cells in the hippocampus. These collaterals project to area CA1 of the hippocampus and are an integral part of memory formation and the emotional network of the Papez circuit, and of the hippocampal trisynaptic loop. It is one of the most studied synapses in the world and named after the Hungarian anatomist-neurologist Károly Schaffer.

As a part of the hippocampal structures, Schaffer collaterals develop the limbic system, which plays a critical role in the aspects of learning and memory. The signals of information from the contralateral CA3 region leave via the Schaffer collateral pathways for the CA1 pyramidal neurons. Mature synapses contain fewer Schaffer collateral branches than those synapses that are not fully developed. Many scientists try to use the Schaffer collateral synapse as a sample synapse, a typical excitatory glutamatergic synapse in the cortex that has very well been studied in order to try to identify the rules of both the patterns of stimulation in electrical rules and the chemical mechanisms by which synapses get persistently stronger and which synapses get persistently weaker as well and to develop medication and treatment to cure the chronic diseases, such as dementia and Alzheimer's disease. Moreover, they believe that studying the Schaffer collateral can provide a whole range of understanding how Schaffer collaterals allow us to intervene with drug-treatments and with electrical-stimulation so that the quality of human experience can be improved.

== Development ==
"Schaffer collateral is the conductor of the orchestra, but not the actual instrument that plays the music" - Dr. Patrick K. Stanton .

The functional hippocampus stores long-term memories through synaptic plasticity in terms of storing information. The hippocampus in communication with the neocortex mediates memory degradation. Plastic changes occurring in the hippocampus are involved in directing the process of memory storage.

The Schaffer collateral is involved in activity-dependent plasticity and the information processes that always are processed through the hippocampus all the time. The Schaffer collateral clearly affects whether the target cells fire action potentials or not. However, at the same time, it is triggering the process that takes much longer whereby some synapses get stronger and some get weaker, and overall the patterns of synaptic strength of the network all evolve over time.

Moreover, Schaffer collateral axons develop excitatory synapses that are scattered over the dendritic arborization of hippocampal CA1 pyramidal neurons. In the early stage of long-term potentiation, Schaffer collaterals release glutamate that binds to AMPA receptors of CA1-dendrites. The process of developing a network of CA3-to-CA1 recurrent excitatory glutamatergic synapses alters the frequency of spontaneous action potentials in Schaffer collaterals. By adulthood, CA3 recurrent network activity is reduced, the frequency of spontaneous action potentials is decreased in Schaffer collaterals, and a single release locus synapse with one dendritic spine on a given CA1 pyramidal neuron can be developed by Schaffer collateral axons.

== Location ==
The Schaffer collateral is located between the CA3 region and CA1 region in the hippocampus. Schaffer collaterals are the axons of pyramidal cells that connect two neurons (CA3 and CA1) and transfer information from CA3 to CA1. The entorhinal cortex sends the main input to the dentate gyrus (perforant pathway). From the granule cells of the dentate gyrus, connections are made to the CA3 regions of the hippocampus via mossy fibers. CA3 sends the information signals to CA1 pyramidal cells via the Schaffer collateral and commissural fibers from the contralateral hippocampus as well.

== Function ==
Throughout the memory process in the hippocampus, Schaffer collaterals seem not to play a major role in the formation of actual memory, but it is clear that Schaffer collaterals assist the activity-dependent plasticity and the information processes that are always altered over the course of memory development in the hippocampus. Schaffer collaterals alter the development of the limbic system that is critical for learning and memory. The contralateral CA3 region sends information through Schaffer collateral to the CA1 pyramidal neurons.

== Schaffer collateral and hippocampal synaptic plasticity ==
Plastic changes occurring in the hippocampus are involved in directing the process by which memories get stored. Schaffer collaterals affect the hippocampus to develop short (Short-term Plasticity) and long term synaptic plasticity (Long-term Plasticity) in terms of storing information and changing in the efficiency of synaptic transmission following previous synaptic activity.

=== Long-term Potentiation ===
Long-term potentiation (LTP) in the hippocampal formation is an example model for neural plasticity. Schaffer collateral synapses have been used as a sample synapse, a typical excitatory glutamatergic synapse in the cortex that has very well been studied in order to try to identify the rules of both the patterns of stimulation in electrical rules and the chemical mechanisms by which synapses get persistently stronger and which synapses get persistently weaker as well. LTPs are involved in how people store information and how they retrieve information and involve networks of memories that are involved in facts and in emotions as well because the hippocampus is the part of the limbic system connected to the amygdala.

LTP in the hippocampus is an important model for neural plasticity that contributes to learning and memory. Schaffer collaterals are the axons of the neurons in the CA3 regions of the hippocampus that form synapses in the CA1 regions.

The hippocampus is a part of the feedback process that sends signals to stop cortisol production. Thus, a damaged hippocampus can cause memory loss and inability of cognitive function. Furthermore, as the hippocampus is the region controlling learning and memory processes, the research on Schaffer collaterals may help to find treatments for diseases related to the hippocampus or its neural processing pathways such as Alzheimer's disease, a neurodegenerative disorder.

Long-term potentiation (LTP) of synaptic strength at Schaffer collateral synapses has largely been attributed to changes in the number and biophysical properties of AMPA receptors (AMPARs). Neuropsin has a regulatory effect on Schaffer collateral LTP in the rat hippocampus.

The functional hippocampus needs to store long-term memories. Once the memories are stored, they remain stored for a long time. Long-term changes in synaptic efficacy in the hippocampus can be induced by different patterns of stimulation generating presynaptic and postsynaptic depolarization The theta burst stimulation of Schaffer collaterals can be sufficient to induce LTP by promoting the formation of filamentous actin in CA1 dendrites. Within the mammalian brain, some patterns of synaptic activity produce long-term potentiation (LTP) which is a long-lasting increase in synaptic strength and long-term depression (LTD) which is a long-lasting decrease in synaptic strength.

==== LTP at Schaffer collateral-CA1 synapses and "SK2 channel plasticity" ====
Long-term plasticity in synapses of the hippocampus can be induced by different patterns of stimulation generating pre- and post-synaptic depolarization. These synaptic changes can clearly lead to modification in circuit function and to behavioral plasticity. Some patterns of synaptic activity produce an extensive increase in synaptic strength, also known as Long-Term Potentiation (LTP). In the hippocampus, LTP at Schaffer collateral-CA1 modulates the biophysical properties of AMPA receptors. Moreover, SK2, small-conductance Ca2+-activated K+ channel, changes the shape of excitatory postsynaptic potentials (EPSPs) by coupling with N-methyl D-aspartate receptors (NMDA receptors). The research by Lin MT, et al. was designed to investigate whether SK2 channels participate in synaptic changes when an activity-dependent decrease contributes to LTP.

SK2 channels are ion channels that are activated by an increasing in the concentration of intracellular calcium and as a result of allowing K+ cation to cross the cell membrane. The double immunogold labeling identified that SK2 channels and NMDA cohabit within the postsynaptic density (PSD) of CA1 regions of the hippocampus. The authors used theta-burst pairing (TBP) to produce a rapid potentiation of synaptic strength and to evoke LTP that is induced simultaneously but whose expression levels vary inversely over time, and the result of the TBP induction was compared to the control group. The result showed that the TBP induction of LTP significantly increased EPSPs level. When the stimulus strength was reduced below the action potential threshold, apamin, a neurotoxin, was added to assess the contribution of SK2 activity to EPSPs. It resulted in an increase in the level of EPSPs with blockage of SK2 channels. The TBP induction of LTP abolishes SK2 channel contribution to EPSPs. When the induction of chemical LTP was applied, immunoparticles for SK2 were not found within the PSD of asymmetrical synapses. However, the SK2 immunoparticles were observed within intracellular membranes. The activation of protein kinase A (PKA) downregulates the surface expression of SK2 because PKA regulates the surface expression of AMPA receptors, a non-NMDA-type ionotropic transmembrane receptor, in the hippocampus. Therefore, PKA decreases the activity of LTP-dependent of SK2 channels. See Schaffer collateral#Long-term plasticity.

=== Short-term plasticity ===
Short-term synaptic plasticity undergoes important age-dependent changes that have crucial implications during the development of the nervous system.

== Vesicular release at "Schaffer Collateral" ==
Transmitters are released from pre-synaptic terminals through fusion of vesicles to the membrane, that are filled with neurotransmitters such as glutamate. Vesicles are exocytosed, with neurotransmitters reentering the presynaptic terminal for reuse. These fused vesicles then reenter preferentially back into the rapidly recycling pool for reuse. Additional vesicles within the reserve pool of the presynaptic terminal are released according to stronger amplitude depolarizations of the presynaptic axon due to greater spatial or temporal summation of action potentials, corresponding to greater calcium influx polarizing. Rate of endocytosis is dependent on rate at which vesicles are recycled into the recycling pool.

Multivesicular release (MVR) occurs at Schaffer collateral-CA1 synapses when P is elevated by facilitation and that MVR may be a phenomenon common to many synapses throughout the central nervous system.
