= Tetanic stimulation =

High frequency neuron stimulation

In neurobiology, a tetanic stimulation consists of a high-frequency sequence of individual stimulations of a neuron. It is associated with potentiation.

High-frequency stimulation causes an increase in release called post-tetanic potentiation (Kandel 2003). This presynaptic event is caused by calcium influx. Calcium-protein interactions then produce a change in vesicle exocytosis. The result of these changes is to make the postsynaptic cell more likely to fire an action potential.

Tetanic stimulation is used in medicine to detect a non-depolarizing block or a depolarizing block on the neuromuscular junction. Lower elicitations of tetanic stimulation in aged muscles were shown to be caused by lower levels of anaerobic energy provision in skeletal muscles.

== Physiological basis ==
Tetanic stimulation is based upon temporal summation, a physiological process in which successive action potentials occur prior to complete muscle relaxation. These repeated impulses lead to a summation of muscle tension which maintains contraction. When a motor neuron delivers a rapid series of electrical stimuli to a muscle at the neuromuscular junction, tetanic stimulation is mediated by increased calcium influx, which encourages neurotransmitter release and eventually post-tetanic potentiation.

At the neuromuscular junction, each electrical impulse triggers the release of acetylcholine, a neurotransmitter involved in voluntary muscle control, memory, and regulatory functions, from presynaptic vesicles into the synaptic cleft. During the high-frequency stimulation involved with tetanic stimulation, calcium ions accumulate due to the increased rate of calcium influx compared to the lowered rate of clearance by physiological buffering systems. The continuous presence of these ions promote additional vesicle fusion and acetylcholine release, which ultimately amplifies the postsynaptic response.

This mechanism allows for post-tetanic potentiation (PTP), a temporary (seconds to minutes) increase in the synaptic strength that occurs after a time period of high-frequency electrical stimulation. PTP is currently thought to occur due to residual calcium that enhances vesicle priming and neurotransmitter release, but complete evidence for this is lacking and research is underway. This phenomenon has however provided insights to synaptic plasticity, which is a process central to the neuromechanics of learning, memory, and long-term potentiation in the central nervous system.

As for the peripheral nervous system, studies have shown that tetanic neuromuscular electrical stimulation can activate peripheral motor neurons and sensory afferents. This can be used to excite spinal motor neurons and influence contraction strengths. This shows that tetanic NMES engages both peripheral and central mechanisms, which can be important for rehabilitation and neuromuscular training.

In experimental/research settings, tetanic stimulation is often used to probe the dynamics of neurotransmitter release and calcium regulation. Frequencies between 50 Hz to 100 Hz are commonly required to produce complete tetanus, however this range varies among muscle types.

== Clinical applications of tetanic stimulation ==
Neuromuscular monitoring in anesthesiology uses tetanic stimulation to evaluate depths of neuromuscular blockades through post-tetanic count. When patients are administered neuromuscular blocking agents (NMBAs) to induce muscle relaxation for procedures, clinicians have to assess the intensity and recovery of induced paralysis for the safety of the patient. Because of this, tetanic stimulation can be used to guide anesthesiologists in determining dosages and recovery steps. A common clinical application of this would be the post-tetanic count method in which single electrical impulses are delivered at 1 Hz immediately after a tetanic train. This allows for observable responses which can be indirectly used to measure recovery from muscle paralysis. As the neuromuscular blockade fades, the post-tetanic count increases gradually, which helps anesthesiologists in determining patient recovery. However, because tetanic stimulation can be painful in patients that are not fully anesthetized, it should only be applied under sedation for intervals no longer than 2–3 minutes.

Tetanic stimulation is also used in augmenting motor evoked potentials during intraoperative neuromonitoring. Motor evoked potentials are electrophysiological signals that can reflect the functionality of motor pathways in the body and are usually monitored during operations on the brain or spine. Recent research has demonstrated that the application of tetanic stimulation to a peripheral nerve can temporarily increase spinal anterior horn cell excitability. This leads to larger and more reliable motor evoked potentials that improve the detectability and consistency of motor evoked potentials during surgery, which makes intraoperative motor monitoring safer and more accurate.

In an even more specialized case, pudendal nerve tetanic stimulation was shown to enhance the amplitude of motor evoked potentials, making identification rates increase in pediatric craniotomies compared to general stimulation of other nerves. This method improved monitoring reliability as well as reduced false negatives during the procedure.

These findings suggest that tetanic stimulation can be used for diverse scenarios in clinical settings such as improving signal qualities and guiding decision making during operations and procedures.

== Limitations and considerations ==
Although tetanic stimulation is incredibly informative and mostly beneficial during use, there are a few limitations and precautions that should be taken into account prior to use.

The high frequency stimulation involved in tetanic stimulation can produce intense and sustained muscle contractions that are painful to patients that are not properly anesthetized. This causes some limitations in research, as trials cannot be performed to determine applications of tetanic stimulation on human patients that are not under anesthesia.

In addition to this, the effects of tetanic stimulation are highly dependent upon the parameters of its use, such as stimulation intensity, duration, and site of application. In most cases, a stimulation of about 50 Hz produces complete tetanus while lower frequencies produce partial contractions. Because of the small variations that may occur physiologically during tetanic stimulation, it is difficult to generalize results on topics such as post-tetanic potentiation and muscle fatigue.

Because of the variation in responses between muscle contractions, individuals, data recording, and other factors, data interpretation of tetanic stimulation is prone to misinterpretation. Without a commonly used standardized data collection and interpretation method available, research is currently limited on the topic.

== History ==
The scientific exploration of tetanic stimulation goes back to early electrophysical research done in the 19th and early 20th centuries. In particular, a foundational study conducted in the 1970s by Erulkar and Rahamimoff showed that calcium ions were central to the increased neurotransmitter release observed during and immediately after tetanic stimulation. Their experiments were conducted on frogs at various neuromuscular junctions and determined that tetanic trains enhance miniature end-plate potential frequency through sustained calcium entry. It was also found that residual calcium contributed to post-tetanic potentiation even after stimulation was stopped. This research provided a foundation for understanding the short-term plasticity of both the peripheral and central nervous systems.

Building off of this work, later research done in the 2000s expanded the use of tetanic stimulation from a basic physiological understanding to clinical applications. Research was conducted on neuromuscular electrical stimulation for motor rehabilitation in patients, which then determined that it activated peripheral motor fibers and central nervous system circuits through sensory afferents. This opened many possibilities for further research especially in topics related to neuroplasticity in rehabilitation therapies.

More recently, tetanic stimulation has been applied in intraoperative neuromonitoring and anesthesiological settings mentioned previously. Research is still ongoing within the subject of tetanic stimulation and is not as commonly conducted compared to other neurological and electrophysical studies available at this time.

== See also ==
- Hebbian theory
