= William H. Skaggs =

Political figure (1861–1947)

William H. Skaggs (September 16, 1861 – January 19, 1947) was a political figure in Alabama.

Among Skaggs' publications were:

- The Southern Oligarchy: An Appeal in Behalf of the Silent Masses of Our Country Against the �Despotic Rule of the Few., discussed by Robert E Park in American Journal of Sociology,
- German Conspiracies in America; From an American Point of View. By an American. London: Unwin, (1915). OCLC 253091747

Skaggs also edited *America and the War in Europe: a Symposium. 1915 OCLC 70771729
