= Bruce McNaughton =

- Education: Carleton University; Dalhousie University
- Known for: Systems neuroscience
- Scientific career
- Fields: Neuroscience
- Institutions: University of Arizona; University of Lethbridge; University of California, Irvine
- Thesis: The dynamics of synaptic modulation in the medial and lateral components of the perforant pathway to the fascia dentata in the rat (1978)
- Doctoral advisor: Graham Goddard
- Notable students: Edvard Moser

Peter Bruce L. McNaughton FRSC is a Canadian neuroscientist and Distinguished Professor at the University of California, Irvine (UC Irvine), as well as a Professor of Neuroscience and director of the Polaris Brain Dynamics research group at The Canadian Centre for Behavioural Neuroscience. He joined the faculty of UC Irvine in 2014, after having taught at the University of Lethbridge for six years. He had moved his lab from the University of Arizona to the University of Lethbridge in 2008 after winning the Polaris Award from the Alberta Heritage Foundation for Medical Research. He was elected as a Fellow of the Royal Society of Canada in 2016. He is also a lifetime member of the Royal Norwegian Society of Sciences and Letters.
