= Long-term potentiation =

Persistent strengthening of synapses based on recent patterns of activity

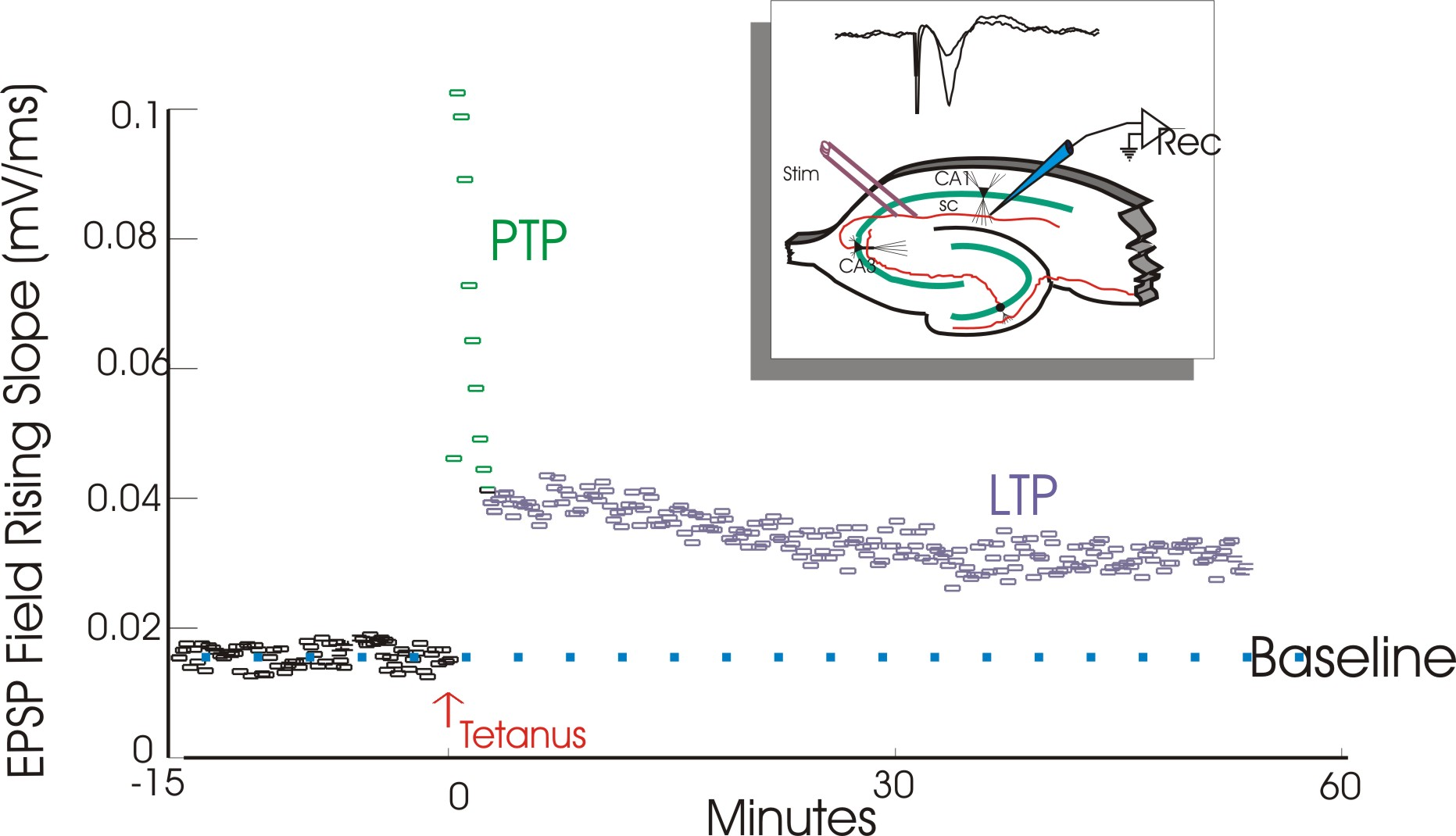
Long-term potentiation (LTP) is a persistent increase in synaptic strength following high-frequency stimulation of a chemical synapse. Studies of LTP are often carried out in slices of the hippocampus, an important brain region for learning and memory. In such studies, electrical recordings are made from cells and plotted in a graph such as this one. This graph compares the response to stimuli in synapses that have undergone LTP versus synapses that have not undergone LTP. Synapses that have undergone LTP tend to have stronger electrical responses to stimuli than other synapses. The term long-term potentiation comes from the fact that this increase in synaptic strength, or potentiation, lasts a very long time compared to other processes that affect synaptic strength.

In neuroscience, long-term potentiation (LTP) is a persistent strengthening of synapses based on recent patterns of activity. These are patterns of synaptic activity that produce a long-lasting increase in signal transmission between two neurons. The opposite of LTP is long-term depression, which produces a long-lasting decrease in synaptic strength.

It is one of several phenomena underlying synaptic plasticity, the ability of chemical synapses to change their strength. As memories are thought to be encoded by modification of synaptic strength, LTP is widely considered one of the major cellular mechanisms that underlies learning and memory.

LTP was discovered in the rabbit hippocampus by Terje Lømo in 1966 and has remained a popular subject of research since. Many modern LTP studies seek to better understand its basic biology, while others aim to draw a causal link between LTP and behavioral learning. Still, others try to develop methods, pharmacologic or otherwise, of enhancing LTP to improve learning and memory. LTP is also a subject of clinical research, for example, in the areas of Alzheimer's disease and addiction medicine.

== History ==
=== Early theories of learning ===
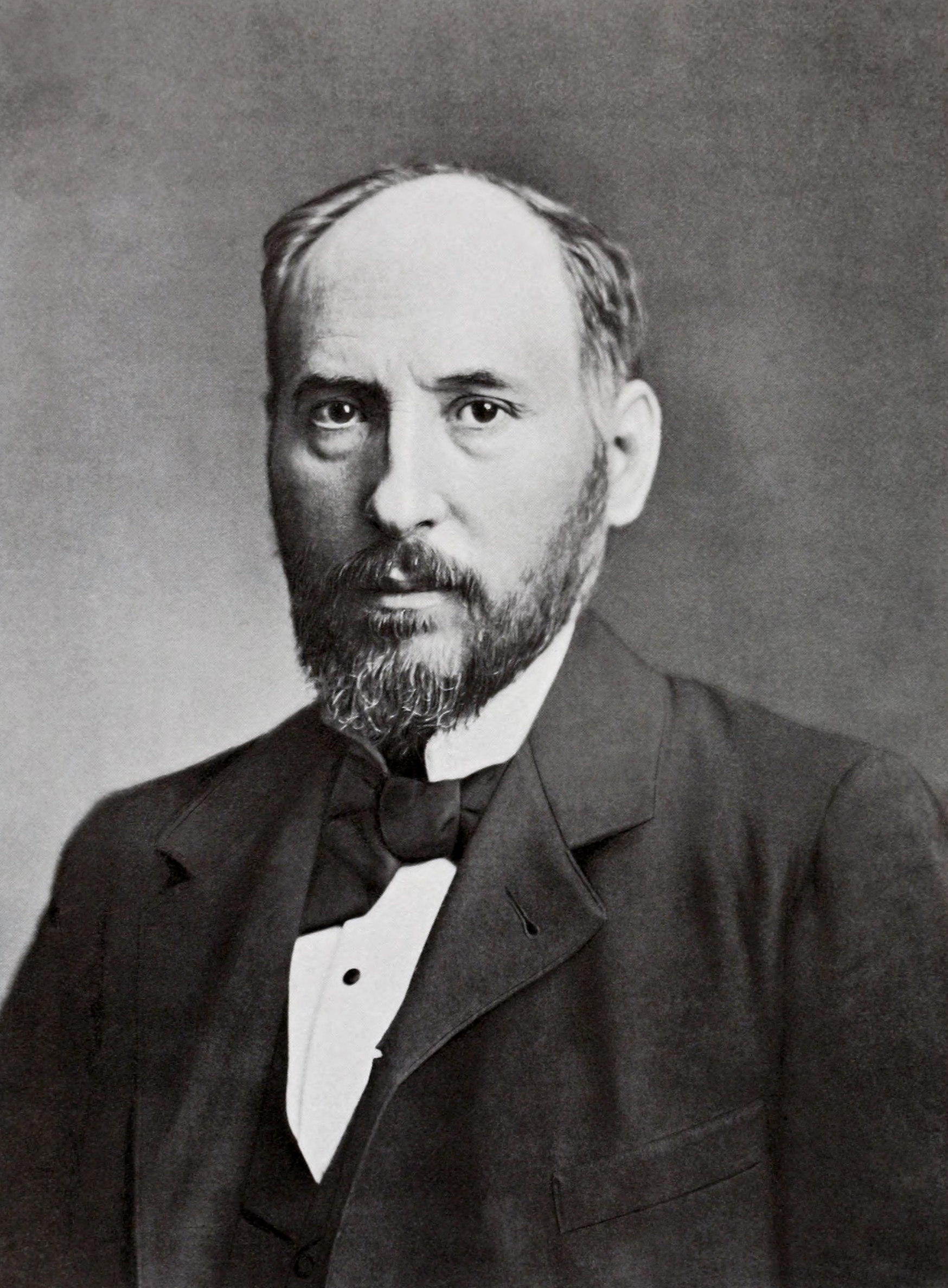
The 19th century neuroanatomist Santiago Ramón y Cajal proposed that memories might be stored across synapses, the junctions between neurons that allow for their communication.

At the end of the 19th century, scientists generally recognized that the number of neurons in the adult brain (roughly 100 billion) did not increase significantly with age, giving neurobiologists good reason to believe that memories were generally not the result of new neuron production. With this realization came the need to explain how memories could form in the absence of new neurons.

The Spanish neuroanatomist Santiago Ramón y Cajal was among the first to suggest a mechanism of learning that did not require the formation of new neurons. In his 1894 Croonian Lecture, he proposed that memories might instead be formed by strengthening the connections between existing neurons to improve the effectiveness of their communication. Hebbian theory, introduced by Donald Hebb in 1949, echoed Ramón y Cajal's ideas, further proposing that cells may grow new connections or undergo metabolic and synaptic changes that enhance their ability to communicate and create a neural network of experiences:

Let us assume that the persistence or repetition of a reverberatory activity (or "trace") tends to induce lasting cellular changes that add to its stability.... When an axon of cell A is near enough to excite a cell B and repeatedly or persistently takes part in firing it, some growth process or metabolic change takes place in one or both cells such that A's efficiency, as one of the cells firing B, is increased.

Eric Kandel (1964) and associates were some of the first researchers to discover long-term potentiation during their work with sea slug Aplysia. They attempted to apply behavioral conditioning to different cells in the slug's neural network. Their results showed synaptic strength changes and researchers suggested that this may be due to a basic form of learning occurring within the slug.

Though these theories of memory formation are now well established, they were farsighted for their time: late 19th and early 20th century neuroscientists and psychologists were not equipped with the neurophysiological techniques necessary for elucidating the biological underpinnings of learning in animals. These skills would not come until the later half of the 20th century, at about the same time as the discovery of long-term potentiation.

=== Discovery ===
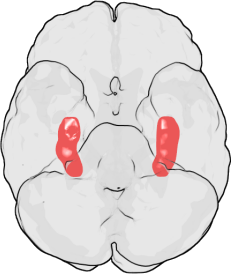
LTP was first discovered in the rabbit hippocampus. In humans, the hippocampus is located in the medial temporal lobe. This illustration of the underside of the human brain shows the hippocampus highlighted in red. The frontal lobe is at the top of the illustration and the occipital lobe is at the bottom.

LTP was first observed by Terje Lømo in 1966 in the Oslo, Norway, laboratory of Per Andersen. There, Lømo conducted a series of neurophysiological experiments on anesthetized rabbits to explore the role of the hippocampus in short-term memory.

Lømo's experiments focused on connections, or synapses, from the perforant pathway to the dentate gyrus. These experiments were carried out by stimulating presynaptic fibers of the perforant pathway and recording responses from a collection of postsynaptic cells of the dentate gyrus. As expected, a single pulse of electrical stimulation to fibers of the perforant pathway caused excitatory postsynaptic potentials (EPSPs) in cells of the dentate gyrus. What Lømo unexpectedly observed was that the postsynaptic cells' response to these single-pulse stimuli could be enhanced for a long period of time if he first delivered a high-frequency train of stimuli to the presynaptic fibers. When such a train of stimuli was applied, subsequent single-pulse stimuli elicited stronger, prolonged EPSPs in the postsynaptic cell population. This phenomenon, whereby a high-frequency stimulus could produce a long-lived enhancement in the postsynaptic cells' response to subsequent single-pulse stimuli, was initially called "long-lasting potentiation".

Timothy Bliss, who joined the Andersen laboratory in 1968, collaborated with Lømo and in 1973 the two published the first characterization of long-lasting potentiation in the rabbit hippocampus. Bliss and Tony Gardner-Medwin published a similar report of long-lasting potentiation in the awake animal which appeared in the same issue as the Bliss and Lømo report. In 1975, Douglas and Goddard proposed "long-term potentiation" as a new name for the phenomenon of long-lasting potentiation. Andersen suggested that the authors chose "long-term potentiation" perhaps because of its easily pronounced acronym, "LTP".

=== Models and theory ===
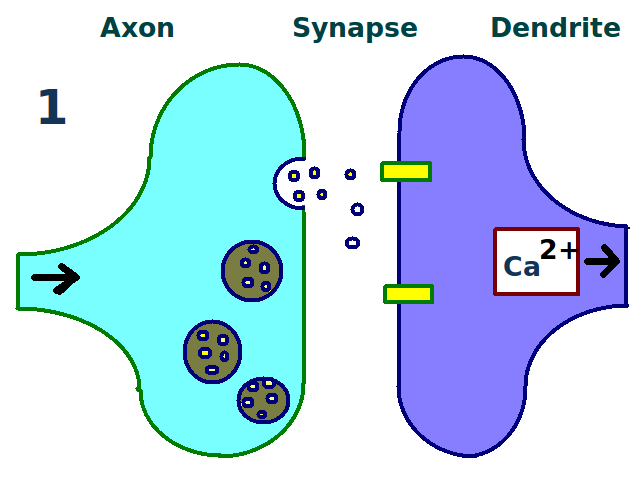
A synapse is repeatedly stimulated.

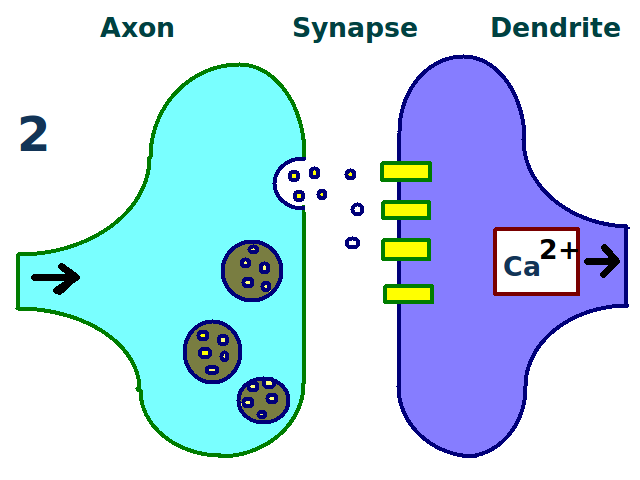
More dendritic receptors.

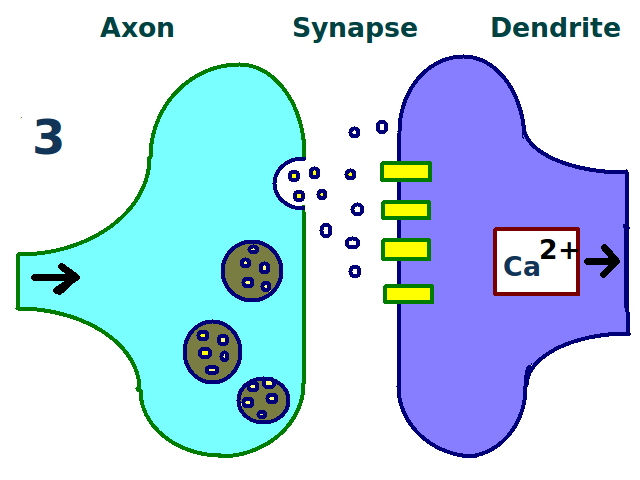
More neurotransmitters.

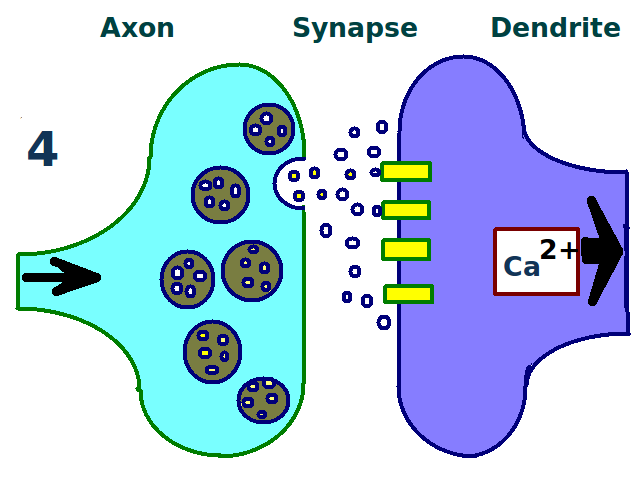
A stronger link between neurons.

The physical and biological mechanism of LTP is still not understood, but some successful models have been developed. Studies of dendritic spines, protruding structures on dendrites that physically grow and retract over the course of minutes or hours, have suggested a relationship between the electrical resistance of the spine and the effective synapse strength, due to their relationship with intracellular calcium transients. Mathematical models such as BCM Theory, which depends also on intracellular calcium in relation to NMDA receptor voltage gates, have been developed since the 1980s and modify the traditional a priori Hebbian learning model with both biological and experimental justification. Still, others have proposed re-arranging or synchronizing the relationship between receptor regulation, LTP, and synaptic strength.

== Types ==
Since its original discovery in the rabbit hippocampus, LTP has been observed in a variety of other neural structures, including the cerebral cortex, cerebellum, amygdala, and many others. Robert Malenka, a prominent LTP researcher, has suggested that LTP may even occur at all excitatory synapses in the mammalian brain.

Different areas of the brain exhibit different forms of LTP. The specific type of LTP exhibited between neurons depends on a number of factors. One such factor is the age of the organism when LTP is observed. For example, the molecular mechanisms of LTP in the immature hippocampus differ from those mechanisms that underlie LTP of the adult hippocampus. The signalling pathways used by a particular cell also contribute to the specific type of LTP present. For example, some types of hippocampal LTP depend on the NMDA receptor, others may depend upon the metabotropic glutamate receptor (mGluR), while still others depend upon another molecule altogether. The variety of signaling pathways that contribute to LTP and the wide distribution of these various pathways in the brain are reasons that the type of LTP exhibited between neurons depends only in part upon the anatomic location in which LTP is observed. For example, LTP in the Schaffer collateral pathway of the hippocampus is NMDA receptor-dependent - this was proved by the application of AP5, an antagonist to the NMDA receptor, which prevented LTP in this pathway. Conversely, LTP in the mossy fiber pathway is NMDA receptor-independent, even though both pathways are in the hippocampus.

The pre- and postsynaptic activity required to induce LTP are other criteria by which LTP is classified. Broadly, this allows classification of LTP into Hebbian, non-Hebbian, and anti-Hebbian mechanisms. Borrowing its name from Hebb's postulate, summarized by the maxim that "cells that fire together wire together," Hebbian LTP requires simultaneous pre- and postsynaptic depolarization for its induction. Non-Hebbian LTP is a type of LTP that does not require such simultaneous depolarization of pre- and postsynaptic cells; an example of this occurs in the mossy fiber hippocampal pathway. A special case of non-Hebbian LTP, anti-Hebbian LTP explicitly requires simultaneous presynaptic depolarization and relative postsynaptic hyperpolarization for its induction.

Owing to its predictable organization and readily inducible LTP, the CA1 hippocampus has become the prototypical site of mammalian LTP study. In particular, NMDA receptor-dependent LTP in the adult CA1 hippocampus is the most widely studied type of LTP, and is therefore, the focus of this article.

== Properties ==
NMDA receptor-dependent LTP exhibits several properties, including input specificity, associativity, cooperativity, and persistence.

Input specificity
Once induced, LTP at one synapse does not spread to other synapses; rather LTP is input specific. Long-term potentiation is only propagated to those synapses according to the rules of associativity and cooperativity. However, the input specificity of LTP may be incomplete at short distances. One model to explain the input specificity of LTP was presented by Frey and Morris in 1997 and is called the synaptic tagging and capture hypothesis.

Associativity
Associativity refers to the observation that when weak stimulation of a single pathway is insufficient for the induction of LTP, simultaneous strong stimulation of another pathway will induce LTP at both pathways.

Cooperativity
LTP can be induced either by strong tetanic stimulation of a single pathway to a synapse, or cooperatively via the weaker stimulation of many. When one pathway into a synapse is stimulated weakly, it produces insufficient postsynaptic depolarization to induce LTP. In contrast, when weak stimuli are applied to many pathways that converge on a single patch of postsynaptic membrane, the individual postsynaptic depolarizations generated may collectively depolarize the postsynaptic cell enough to induce LTP cooperatively. Synaptic tagging, discussed later, may be a common mechanism underlying associativity and cooperativity. Bruce McNaughton argues that any difference between associativity and cooperativity is strictly semantic. Experiments performed by stimulating an array of individual dendritic spines, have shown that synaptic cooperativity by as few as two adjacent dendritic spines prevents long term depression (LTD) allowing only LTP.

Persistence
LTP is persistent, lasting from several minutes to many months, and it is this persistence that separates LTP from other forms of synaptic plasticity.

=== Early phase ===
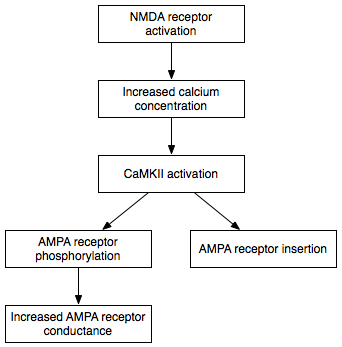
The early phase of LTP, one model of which is shown here, is independent of protein synthesis.

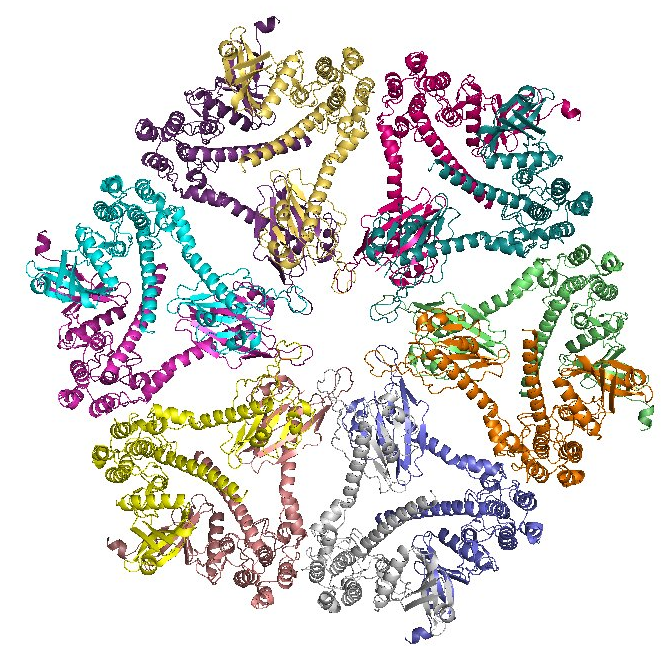
Ca^{2+}/calmodulin-dependent protein kinase II (CaMKII) appears to be an important mediator of the early, protein synthesis-independent phase of LTP.

==== Maintenance ====
While induction entails the transient activation of CaMKII and PKC, maintenance of E-LTP (early-form LTP) is characterized by their persistent activation. During this stage PKMzeta (PKMζ) which does not have dependence on calcium, become autonomously active. Consequently, they are able to carry out the phosphorylation events that underlie E-LTP expression.

==== Expression ====
Phosphorylation is a chemical reaction in which a small phosphate group is added to another molecule to change that molecule's activity. Autonomously active CaMKII and PKC use phosphorylation to carry out the two major mechanisms underlying the expression of E-LTP. First, and most importantly, they phosphorylate existing AMPA receptors to increase their activity. Second, they mediate or modulate the insertion of additional AMPA receptors into the postsynaptic membrane. Importantly, the delivery of AMPA receptors to the synapse during E-LTP is independent of protein synthesis. This is achieved by having a nonsynaptic pool of AMPA receptors adjacent to the postsynaptic membrane. When the appropriate LTP-inducing stimulus arrives, nonsynaptic AMPA receptors are rapidly trafficked into the postsynaptic membrane under the influence of protein kinases. As mentioned previously, AMPA receptors are the brain's most abundant glutamate receptors and mediate the majority of its excitatory activity. By increasing the efficiency and number of AMPA receptors at the synapse, future excitatory stimuli generate larger postsynaptic responses.

While the above model of E-LTP describes entirely postsynaptic mechanisms for induction, maintenance, and expression, an additional component of expression may occur presynaptically. One hypothesis of this presynaptic facilitation is that persistent CaMKII activity in the postsynaptic cell during E-LTP may lead to the synthesis of a "retrograde messenger", discussed later. According to this hypothesis, the newly synthesized messenger travels across the synaptic cleft from the postsynaptic to the presynaptic cell, leading to a chain of events that facilitate the presynaptic response to subsequent stimuli. Such events may include an increase in neurotransmitter vesicle number, probability of vesicle release, or both. In addition to the retrograde messenger underlying presynaptic expression in early LTP, the retrograde messenger may also play a role in the expression of late LTP.

=== Late phase ===
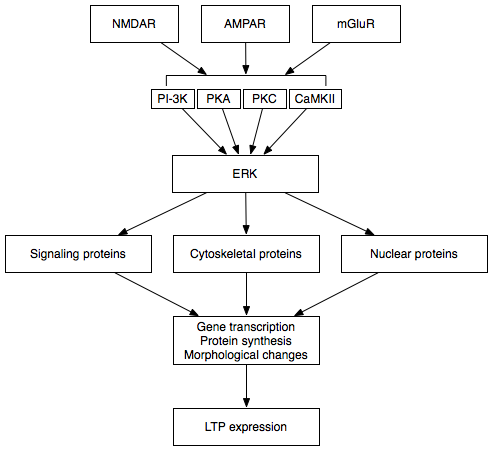
The early and late phases of LTP are thought to communicate via the extracellular signal-regulated kinase (ERK).

Late LTP (L-LTP) is the natural extension of E-LTP. Unlike E-LTP, which is independent of protein synthesis, L-LTP requires gene transcription and protein synthesis in the postsynaptic cell. Two phases of L-LTP exist: the first depends upon protein synthesis, while the second depends upon both gene transcription and protein synthesis. These phases are occasionally called LTP2 and LTP3, respectively, with E-LTP referred to as LTP1 under this nomenclature.

==== Induction ====
Late LTP is induced by changes in gene expression and protein synthesis brought about by the persistent activation of protein kinases activated during E-LTP, such as MAPK. In fact, MAPK—specifically the extracellular signal-regulated kinase (ERK) subfamily of MAPKs—may be the molecular link between E-LTP and L-LTP, since many signaling cascades involved in E-LTP, including CaMKII and PKC, can converge on ERK. Recent research has shown that the induction of L-LTP can depend on coincident molecular events, namely PKA activation and calcium influx, that converge on CRTC1 (TORC1), a potent transcriptional coactivator for cAMP response element binding protein (CREB). This requirement for a molecular coincidence accounts perfectly for the associative nature of LTP, and, presumably, for that of learning.

==== Maintenance ====
Upon activation, ERK may phosphorylate a number of cytoplasmic and nuclear molecules that ultimately result in the protein synthesis and morphological changes observed in L-LTP. These cytoplasmic and nuclear molecules may include transcription factors such as CREB. ERK-mediated changes in transcription factor activity may trigger the synthesis of proteins that underlie the maintenance of L-LTP. One such molecule may be protein kinase Mζ (PKMζ), a persistently active kinase whose synthesis increases following LTP induction. PKMζ is an atypical isoform of PKC that lacks a regulatory subunit and thus remains constitutively active. Unlike other kinases that mediate LTP, PKMζ is active not just in the first 30 minutes following LTP induction; rather, PKMζ becomes a requirement for LTP maintenance only during the late phase of LTP. PKMζ thus appears important for the persistence of memory and would be expected to be important in the maintenance of long-term memory. Indeed, administration of a PKMζ inhibitor into the hippocampus of the rat results in retrograde amnesia with intact short-term memory; PKMζ does not play a role in the establishment of short-term memory. PKMζ has recently been shown to underlie L-LTP maintenance by directing the trafficking and reorganization of proteins in the synaptic scaffolding that underlie the expression of L-LTP. Even more recently, transgenic mice lacking PKMζ demonstrate normal LTP, questioning the necessity of PKMζ. In return it was argued that the related molecule PKC-ι/λ (PKC-ι and PKC-λ isoforms) acted as a compensatory mechanism. It has been also shown that PKMζ works together with KIBRA in anchoring its activity so that when a protein degrades and needs to be replaced, the other remains in place, therefore more crucial than each molecule individually is the interaction between them in the maintenance of L-LTP.

The long-term stabilization of synaptic changes is also determined by a parallel increase of pre- and postsynaptic structures such as axonal bouton, dendritic spine and postsynaptic density. On the molecular level, an increase of the postsynaptic scaffolding proteins PSD-95 and Homer1c has been shown to correlate with the stabilization of synaptic enlargement.

==== Expression ====
The identities of only a few proteins synthesized during L-LTP are known. Regardless of their identities, it is thought that they contribute to the increase in dendritic spine number, surface area, and postsynaptic sensitivity to neurotransmitter associated with L-LTP expression. The latter may be brought about in part by the enhanced synthesis of AMPA receptors during L-LTP. Late LTP is also associated with the presynaptic synthesis of synaptotagmin and an increase in synaptic vesicle number, suggesting that L-LTP induces protein synthesis not only in postsynaptic cells, but in presynaptic cells as well. As mentioned previously, for postsynaptic LTP induction to result in presynaptic protein synthesis, there must be communication from the postsynaptic to the presynaptic cell. This may occur via the synthesis of a retrograde messenger, discussed later.

Even in studies restricted to postsynaptic events, investigators have not determined the location of the protein synthesis that underlies L-LTP. Specifically, it is unclear whether protein synthesis takes place in the postsynaptic cell body or in its dendrites. Despite having observed ribosomes (the major components of the protein synthesis machinery) in dendrites as early as the 1960s, prevailing wisdom was that the cell body was the predominant site of protein synthesis in neurons. This reasoning was not seriously challenged until the 1980s, when investigators reported observing protein synthesis in dendrites whose connection to their cell body had been severed. More recently, investigators have demonstrated that this type of local protein synthesis is necessary for some types of LTP.

One reason for the popularity of the local protein synthesis hypothesis is that it provides a possible mechanism for the specificity associated with LTP. Specifically, if indeed local protein synthesis underlies L-LTP, only dendritic spines receiving LTP-inducing stimuli will undergo LTP; the potentiation will not be propagated to adjacent synapses. By contrast, global protein synthesis that occurs in the cell body requires that proteins be shipped out to every area of the cell, including synapses that have not received LTP-inducing stimuli. Whereas local protein synthesis provides a mechanism for specificity, global protein synthesis would seem to directly compromise it. However, as discussed later, the synaptic tagging hypothesis successfully reconciles global protein synthesis, synapse specificity, and associativity.

=== Retrograde signaling ===
Retrograde signaling is a hypothesis that attempts to explain that, while LTP is induced and expressed postsynaptically, some evidence suggests that it is expressed presynaptically as well. The hypothesis gets its name because normal synaptic transmission is directional and proceeds from the presynaptic to the postsynaptic cell. For induction to occur postsynaptically and be partially expressed presynaptically, a message must travel from the postsynaptic cell to the presynaptic cell in a retrograde (reverse) direction. Once there, the message presumably initiates a cascade of events that leads to a presynaptic component of expression, such as the increased probability of neurotransmitter vesicle release.

Retrograde signaling is currently a contentious subject as some investigators do not believe the presynaptic cell contributes at all to the expression of LTP. Even among proponents of the hypothesis there is controversy over the identity of the messenger. Early thoughts focused on nitric oxide, while most recent evidence points to cell adhesion proteins.

=== Synaptic tagging ===
Before the local protein synthesis hypothesis gained significant support, there was general agreement that the protein synthesis underlying L-LTP occurred in the cell body. Further, there was thought that the products of this synthesis were shipped cell-wide in a nonspecific manner. It thus became necessary to explain how protein synthesis could occur in the cell body without compromising LTP's input specificity. The synaptic tagging hypothesis attempts to solve the cell's difficult problem of synthesizing proteins in the cell body but ensuring they only reach synapses that have received LTP-inducing stimuli.

The synaptic tagging hypothesis proposes that a "synaptic tag" is synthesized at synapses that have received LTP-inducing stimuli, and that this synaptic tag may serve to capture plasticity-related proteins shipped cell-wide from the cell body. Studies of LTP in the marine snail Aplysia californica have implicated synaptic tagging as a mechanism for the input-specificity of LTP. There is some evidence that given two widely separated synapses, an LTP-inducing stimulus at one synapse drives several signaling cascades (described previously) that initiates gene expression in the cell nucleus. At the same synapse (but not the unstimulated synapse), local protein synthesis creates a short-lived (less than three hours) synaptic tag. The products of gene expression are shipped globally throughout the cell, but are only captured by synapses that express the synaptic tag. Thus only the synapse receiving LTP-inducing stimuli is potentiated, demonstrating LTP's input specificity.

The synaptic tag hypothesis may also account for LTP's associativity and cooperativity. Associativity (see Properties) is observed when one synapse is excited with LTP-inducing stimulation while a separate synapse is only weakly stimulated. Whereas one might expect only the strongly stimulated synapse to undergo LTP (since weak stimulation alone is insufficient to induce LTP at either synapse), both synapses will in fact undergo LTP. While weak stimuli are unable to induce protein synthesis in the cell body, they may prompt the synthesis of a synaptic tag. Simultaneous strong stimulation of a separate pathway, capable of inducing cell body protein synthesis, then may prompt the production of plasticity-related proteins, which are shipped cell-wide. With both synapses expressing the synaptic tag, both would capture the protein products resulting in the expression of LTP in both the strongly stimulated and weakly stimulated pathways.

Cooperativity is observed when two synapses are activated by weak stimuli incapable of inducing LTP when stimulated individually. But upon simultaneous weak stimulation, both synapses undergo LTP in a cooperative fashion. Synaptic tagging does not explain how multiple weak stimuli can result in a collective stimulus sufficient to induce LTP (this is explained by the postsynaptic summation of EPSPs described previously). Rather, synaptic tagging explains the ability of weakly stimulated synapses, none of which are capable of independently generating LTP, to receive the products of protein synthesis initiated collectively. As before, this may be accomplished through the synthesis of a local synaptic tag following weak synaptic stimulation.

=== Modulation ===
Proposed modulators of LTP
Modulator	Target
β-Adrenergic receptor	cAMP, MAPK amplification
Nitric oxide synthase	Guanylyl cyclase, PKG, NMDAR
Dopamine receptor	cAMP, MAPK amplification
Metabotropic glutamate receptor	PKC, MAPK amplification

As described previously, the molecules that underlie LTP can be classified as mediators or modulators. A mediator of LTP is a molecule, such as the NMDA receptor or calcium, whose presence and activity is necessary for generating LTP under nearly all conditions. By contrast, a modulator is a molecule that can alter LTP but is not essential for its generation or expression.

In addition to the signaling pathways described above, hippocampal LTP may be altered by a variety of modulators. For example, the steroid hormone estradiol may enhance LTP by driving CREB phosphorylation and subsequent dendritic spine growth. Additionally, β-adrenergic receptor agonists such as norepinephrine may alter the protein synthesis-dependent late phase of LTP. Nitric oxide synthase activity may also result in the subsequent activation of guanylyl cyclase and PKG. Similarly, activation of dopamine receptors may enhance LTP through the cAMP/PKA signaling pathway.

== Relationship to behavioral memory ==
While the long-term potentiation of synapses in cell culture seems to provide an elegant substrate for learning and memory, the contribution of LTP to behavioral learning — that is, learning at the level of the whole organism — cannot simply be extrapolated from in vitro studies. For this reason, considerable effort has been dedicated to establishing whether LTP is a requirement for learning and memory in living animals. Because of this, LTP also plays a crucial role in fear processing.

=== Spatial memory ===
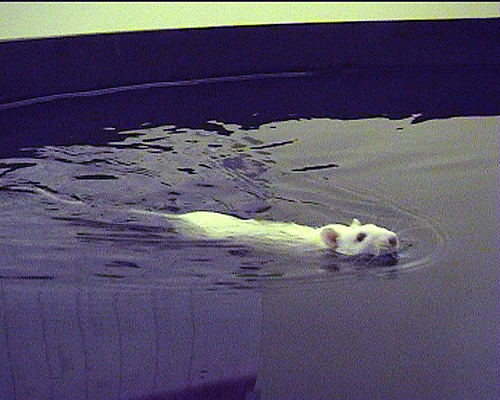
The Morris water maze task has been used to demonstrate the necessity of NMDA receptors in establishing spatial memories.

In 1986, Richard Morris provided some of the first evidence that LTP was indeed required for the formation of memories in vivo. He tested the spatial memory of rats by pharmacologically modifying their hippocampus, a brain structure whose role in spatial learning is well established. Rats were trained on the Morris water maze, a spatial memory task in which rats swim in a pool of murky water until they locate the platform hidden beneath its surface. During this exercise, normal rats are expected to associate the location of the hidden platform with salient cues placed at specific positions around the circumference of the maze. After training, one group of rats had their hippocampi bathed in the NMDA receptor blocker APV, while the other group served as the control. Both groups were then subjected to the water maze spatial memory task. Rats in the control group were able to locate the platform and escape from the pool, while the performance of APV-treated rats was significantly impaired. Moreover, when slices of the hippocampus were taken from both groups, LTP was easily induced in controls, but could not be induced in the brains of APV-treated rats. This provided early evidence that the NMDA receptor — and by extension, LTP — was required for at least some types of learning and memory.

Similarly, Susumu Tonegawa demonstrated in 1996 that the CA1 area of the hippocampus is crucial to the formation of spatial memories in living mice. So-called place cells located in this region become active only when the rat is in a particular location — called a place field — in the environment. Since these place fields are distributed throughout the environment, one interpretation is that groups of place cells form maps in the hippocampus. The accuracy of these maps determines how well a rat learns about its environment and thus how well it can navigate it. Tonegawa found that by impairing the NMDA receptor, specifically by genetically removing the NR1 subunit in the CA1 region, the place fields generated were substantially less specific than those of controls. That is, mice produced faulty spatial maps when their NMDA receptors were impaired. As expected, these mice performed very poorly on spatial tasks compared to controls, further supporting the role of LTP in spatial learning.

Enhanced NMDA receptor activity in the hippocampus has also been shown to produce enhanced LTP and an overall improvement in spatial learning. In 1999, Tang et al. produced a line of mice with enhanced NMDA receptor function by overexpressing the NR2B subunit in the hippocampus. The resulting smart mice, nicknamed "Doogie mice" after the fictional prodigious doctor Doogie Howser, had larger LTP and excelled at spatial learning tasks, reinforcing LTP's importance in the formation of hippocampus-dependent memories.

=== Inhibitory avoidance ===
In 2006, Jonathan Whitlock and colleagues reported on a series of experiments that provided perhaps the strongest evidence of LTP's role in behavioral memory, arguing that to conclude that LTP underlies behavioral learning, the two processes must both mimic and occlude one another. Employing an inhibitory avoidance learning paradigm, researchers trained rats in a two-chambered apparatus with light and dark chambers, the latter being fitted with a device that delivered a foot shock to the rat upon entry. An analysis of CA1 hippocampal synapses revealed that inhibitory avoidance training induced in vivo AMPA receptor phosphorylation of the same type as that seen in LTP in vitro; that is, inhibitory avoidance training mimicked LTP. In addition, synapses potentiated during training could not be further potentiated by experimental manipulations that would have otherwise induced LTP; that is, inhibitory avoidance training occluded LTP. In a response to the article, Timothy Bliss and colleagues remarked that these and related experiments "substantially advance the case for LTP as a neural mechanism for memory."

== Clinical significance ==
The role of LTP in disease is less clear than its role in basic mechanisms of synaptic plasticity. However, alterations in LTP may contribute to a number of neurological diseases, including depression, Parkinson's disease, epilepsy, and neuropathic pain. Impaired LTP may also have a role in Alzheimer's disease and drug addiction.

=== Alzheimer's disease ===
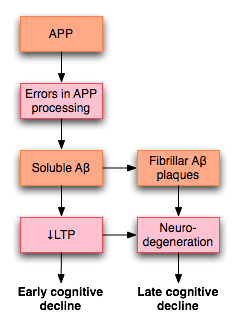
Misprocessing of amyloid precursor protein (APP) in Alzheimer's disease disrupts LTP and is thought to lead to early cognitive decline in individuals with the disease.

LTP has received much attention among those who study Alzheimer's disease (AD), a neurodegenerative disease that causes marked cognitive decline and dementia. Much of this deterioration occurs in association with degenerative changes in the hippocampus and other medial temporal lobe structures. Because of the hippocampus' well established role in LTP, some have suggested that the cognitive decline seen in individuals with AD may result from impaired LTP.

In a 2003 review of the literature, Rowan et al. proposed one model for how LTP might be affected in AD. AD appears to result, at least in part, from misprocessing of amyloid precursor protein (APP). The result of this abnormal processing is the accumulation of fragments of this protein, called amyloid β (Aβ). Aβ exists in both soluble and fibrillar forms. Misprocessing of APP results in the accumulation of soluble Aβ that, according to Rowan's hypothesis, impairs hippocampal LTP and may lead to the cognitive decline seen early in AD.

AD may also impair LTP through mechanisms distinct from Aβ. For example, one study demonstrated that the enzyme PKMζ accumulates in neurofibrillary tangles, which are a pathologic marker of AD. PKMζ is an enzyme with critical importance in the maintenance of late LTP.

=== Drug addiction ===
Research in the field of addiction medicine has also recently turned its focus to LTP, owing to the hypothesis that drug addiction represents a powerful form of learning and memory. Addiction is a complex neurobehavioral phenomenon involving various parts of the brain, such as the ventral tegmental area (VTA) and nucleus accumbens (NAc). Studies have demonstrated that VTA and NAc synapses are capable of undergoing LTP and that this LTP may be responsible for the behaviors that characterize addiction.

== See also ==
- Neuroplasticity
- Actin remodeling of neurons
- Transcranial direct-current stimulation
- Post-tetanic potentiation
