= Immediate early gene =

Type of gene

Immediate early genes (IEGs) are genes which are activated transiently and rapidly in response to a wide variety of cellular stimuli. They represent a standing response mechanism that is activated at the transcription level in the first round of response to stimuli, before any new proteins are synthesized. IEGs are distinct from "late response" genes, which can only be activated later, following the synthesis of early response gene products. Thus IEGs have been called the "gateway to the genomic response". The term can describe viral regulatory proteins that are synthesized following viral infection of a host cell, or cellular proteins that are made immediately following stimulation of a resting cell by extracellular signals.

In their role as "gateways to genomic response", many IEG products are natural transcription factors or other DNA-binding proteins. However, other important classes of IEG products include secreted proteins, cytoskeletal proteins, and receptor subunits. Neuronal IEGs are used prevalently as a marker to track brain activities in the context of memory formation and development of psychiatric disorders. IEGs are also of interest as a therapeutic target for treatment of human cytomegalovirus.

== Types ==
The earliest identified and best characterized IEGs include c-fos, c-myc and c-jun, genes that were found to be homologous to retroviral oncogenes. Thus IEGs are well known as early regulators of cell growth and differentiation signals. However, other findings suggest roles for IEGs in many other cellular processes. Arc/Arg3.1, Zif268 and Homer are IEGs that regulate synaptic strength in neurons.

== Regulation ==
Expression of IEGs occurs in response to internal and external cell signals, occurring rapidly without the need to synthesize new transcription factors. The genetic sequences of IEGs are generally shorter in length (~19kb) and exhibit an enrichment of specific transcription factor binding sites, offering redundancy in transcription initiation. Transcription of IEG into mRNA occurs regardless of protein synthesis inhibitors which disrupts the process of protein production. Rapid expression of IEGs is also attributed to the accessibility of its promotor sequence through histone acetylation that is consistent pre- and post-expression. Downregulation of mRNA transcription occurs through redundant targeting of the 3' UTR region by microRNAs, resulting in translational repression and degradation. The expression of IEG protein is often transient due to rapid mRNA downregulation and increased proteolysis of translated products.

== Function ==
Activation of gene transcription is a complex system of signal cascades and recruitment of necessary components such as RNA polymerase and transcription factors. IEGs are often the first responders to regulatory signals with many reaching peak expression within 30 minutes after stimuli compared to 2–4 hours in the case of delayed primary response gene. There are many signaling pathways leading to the activation of IEGs, many of which (MAPK/ERK, PI3K, etc.) are studied in the context of cancer. As such, many IEGs function as transcription factors regulating expression of downstream genes or are proto-oncogenes associated with altered cell growth.

== IEGs in neurobiological research ==
Expression of IEGs is involved in neuronal activity and specifically memory formation, neuropsychiatric diseases, and behavioral activities. Immediate early genes present in the brain are associated with a range of functions such as modifying synaptic functions through transient and rapid activation growth factors or the expression of cellular proteins. These changes are theorized to be the means in which memory is stored in the brain as outline in the concept of memory trace or engram. In the context of neuropsychiatric diseases, up-regulation of certain IEGs related to the formation of fear-related memories contribute to the development of a variety of disease such as schizophrenia, Panic disorder, Post-traumatic stress disorder

=== Memory formation ===
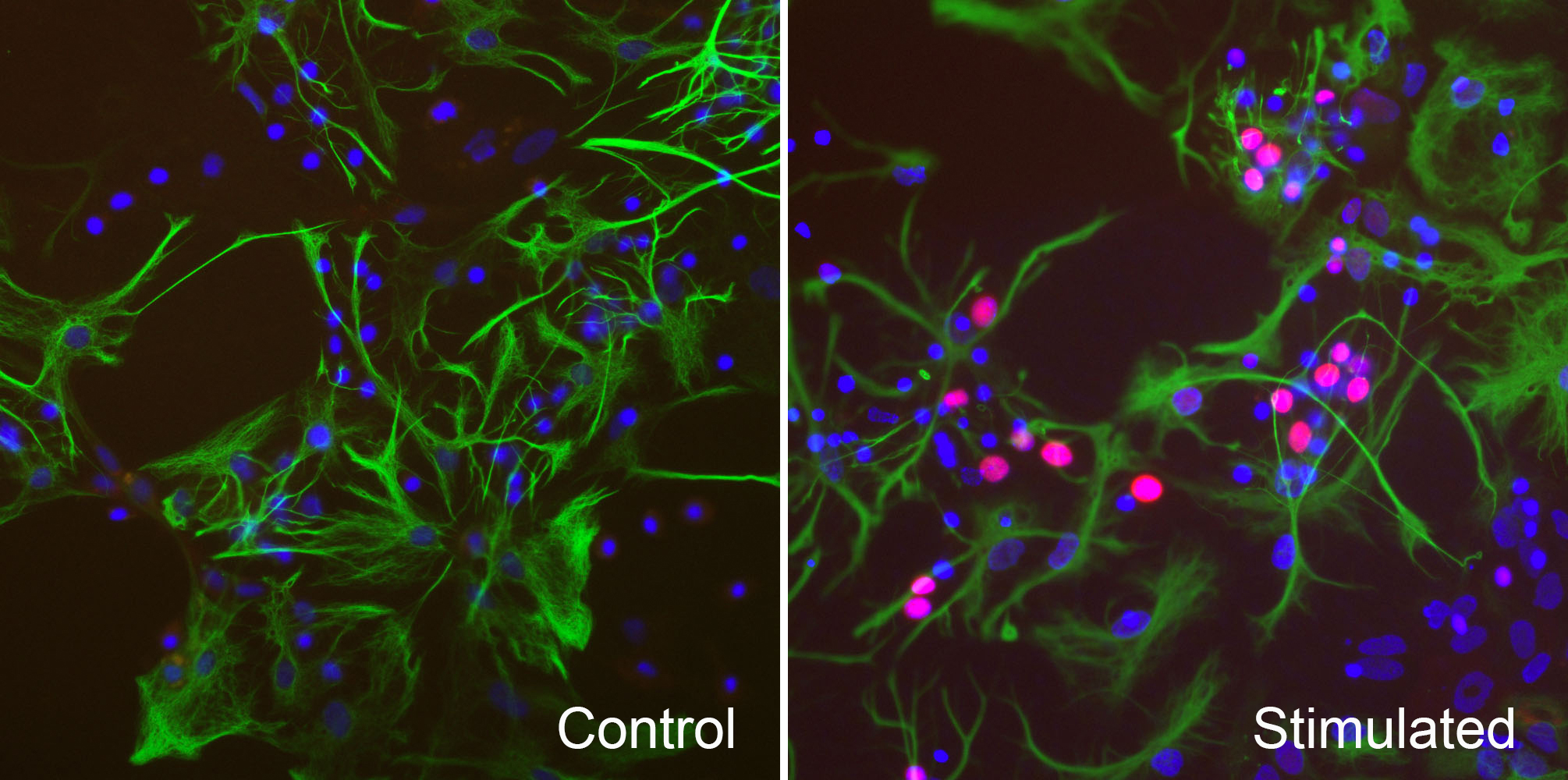
Expression of IEG c-Fos in neurons responding to stimulation with potassium treatment

Some IEGs such as ZNF268 and Arc have been implicated in learning and memory and long-term potentiation.

A wide range of neuronal stimulation have been shown to induce IEG expression ranging from sensory and behavioral to drug-induced convulsions. As such, IEGs are utilized as a marker to understand neuronal ensembles associated with formations of certain memories such as fear, commonly attributed to the development of psychiatric disorders. For example, neurons expressing Arc in the hippocampus show phenotypic and behavioral differences in response to stimuli such as altered dendritic spine morphology or spontaneous firing rate. This association suggests the expression of certain IEGs in response to a stimulus results in expansion of the related neuronal circuit by incorporating the activated neuron assembles. Other IEGs effect different neural properties with knock out of Arc showing adverse affects on the formation of long-term memory. These findings offer insight into the molecular mechanism and functional changes brought about by IEG expression, expanding the theory of memory trace.

Memory consolidation during a learning experience depends on the rapid expression of a set of IEGs in brain neurons. In general, expression of genes often can be epigenetically repressed by the presence of 5-methylcytosine in the DNA promoter regions of the genes. However, in the case of IEGs associated with memory consolidation demethylation of 5-methylcytosine to form the normal base cytosine can induce rapid gene expression. Demethylation appears to occur by a DNA repair process involving the GADD45G protein.

=== Psychiatric disorders ===
IEGs are used as markers in animal models of depression. Affected mice have altered levels of Arc,affecting synaptic activity, and EGR1, involved in memory trace encoding. Other neuropsychiatric illnesses such as schizophrenia also exhibit altered IEG expression, with recent studies showing a correlation of low expression of EGR3, a transcription factor downstream of NMDARs, in patients exhibiting schizophrenia. As such, IEGs are crucial markers in evaluating neuronal activity in the context of psychiatric illness with its expression pattern shaped by environmental and genetic factors.

== Potential therapeutic applications ==
=== Human cytomegalovirus ===
Human cytomegalovirus (HCMV) is a prevalent beta herpesvirus that remains in the latent state, going unnoticed in healthy individuals but having serious consequences if the individual is immunocompromised. The virus cycles in and out of the latent state and is characterized by different gene expression regions: immediate-early (IE), early, and late. Conventional anti-viral treatments such as Ganciclovir use nucleoside analogs to target the early events of the viral replication cycles, however, these approaches are prone to developing resistance. Targeting IE1 and IE2 are thought to be crucial in regulating the pathogenesis of HCMV and retaining the virus in the latent state. Viral proteins derived from IE1 and IE2 regulate viral latency by controlling subsequent expression of early and late genes. Silencing of IE gene expression through antisense oligonucleotides, RNA interference, and gene-targeting ribosomes have been investigated for therapeutic applications. Alternatively, the rise of CRISPR technology allows for precise DNA editing that can knockout HCMV genes responsible for IE transcription. DNA targeting is more effective in latent infections, in which viral mRNA is absent or at a low concentration. Small molecule chemical inhibitors are also being investigated that target epigenetic factors and signaling proteins involved in IE expression.
