= Chromosome 5q deletion syndrome =

Human disease

- Other names: Chromosome 5q monosomy, 5q- syndrome
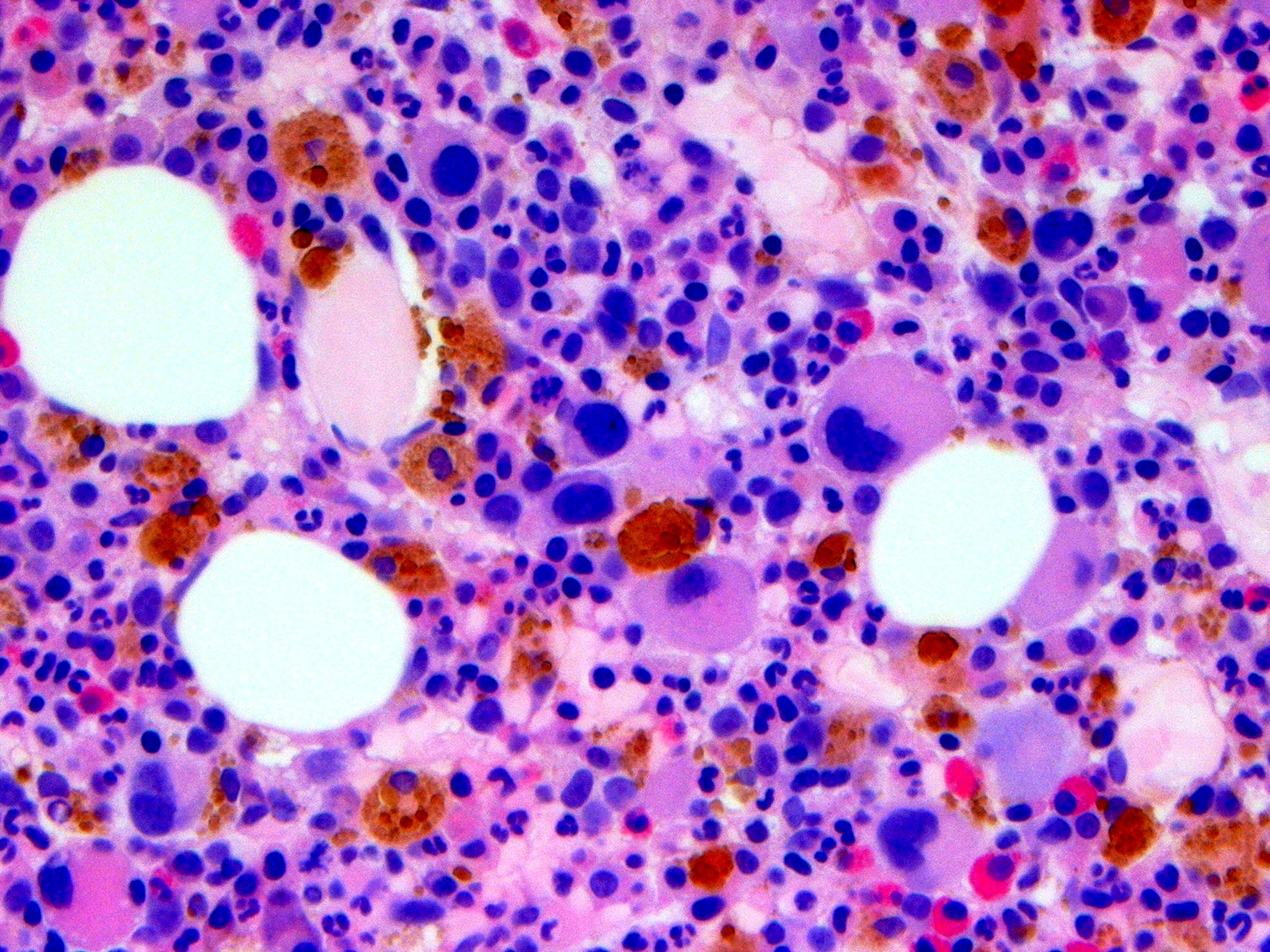
- Photomicrograph of bone marrow showing abnormal mononuclear megakaryocytes typical of 5q- syndrome
- Specialty: Hematology

Chromosome 5q deletion syndrome is an acquired, hematological disorder characterized by loss of part of the long arm (q arm, band 5q33.1) of human chromosome 5 in bone marrow myelocyte cells. This chromosome abnormality is most commonly associated with the myelodysplastic syndrome.

It should not be confused with "partial trisomy 5q", though both conditions have been observed in the same family. Diagnosis is achieved through marrow biopsy.

== Presentation ==
The 5q-syndrome is characterized by macrocytic anemia, often a moderate thrombocytosis, erythroblastopenia, megakaryocyte hyperplasia with nuclear hypolobation, and an isolated interstitial deletion of chromosome 5. The 5q- syndrome is found predominantly in females of advanced age.

== Causes ==
Several genes in the deleted region appear to play a role in the pathogenesis of 5q-syndrome. Haploinsufficiency of RPS14 plays a central role, and contributes to the anemia via both p53-dependent and p53-independent tumor suppressor effects. Other genes at this region include miR-145 and miR-146a, whose deletion is associated with the megakaryocytic dysplasia and thrombocytosis seen in 5q- syndrome; SPARC, which has antiproliferative and antiangiogenic effects; and the candidate tumor suppressors EGR1, CTNNA1, and CDC25C.

== Histology ==
This syndrome affects bone marrow cells causing treatment-resistant anemia and myelodysplastic syndromes that may lead to acute myelogenous leukemia. Examination of the bone marrow shows characteristic changes in the megakaryocytes. They are more numerous than usual, small and mononuclear. There may be accompanying erythroid hypoplasia in the bone marrow.

== Treatment ==
Lenalidomide has activity in 5q- syndrome and is FDA approved for red blood cell (RBC) transfusion-dependent anemia due to low or intermediate-1 (int-1) risk myelodysplastic syndrome (MDS) associated with chromosome 5q deletion with or without additional cytogenetic abnormalities. There are several possible mechanisms that link the haploinsufficiency molecular lesions with lenalidomide sensitivity.
