= Activity-regulated cytoskeleton-associated protein =

Protein-coding gene in the species Homo sapiens

ARC
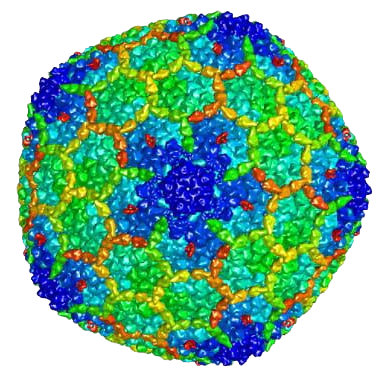

Identifiers
- Aliases: ARC, Arg3.1, activity-regulated cytoskeleton-associated protein, activity regulated cytoskeleton associated protein, hArc
- External IDs: OMIM: 612461; MGI: 88067; GeneCards: ARC

Gene location (Human)
Chr.	Chromosome 8 (human)
Band	8q24.3	Start	142,611,049 bp
Band	8q24.3	End	142,614,479 bp

Gene location (Mouse)
Chr.	Chromosome 15 (mouse)
Band	15 D3|15 34.25 cM	Start	74,540,932 bp
Band	15 D3|15 34.25 cM	End	74,544,419 bp
RNA expression pattern
Bgee	Human / Mouse (ortholog); Top expressed in: anterior pituitary; right frontal lobe; prefrontal cortex; cingulate gyrus; anterior cingulate cortex; testicle; dorsolateral prefrontal cortex; ganglionic eminence; ventricular zone; Brodmann area 9 / Top expressed in: primary visual cortex; superior frontal gyrus; seminiferous tubule; prefrontal cortex; spermatid; primary motor cortex; dentate gyrus of hippocampal formation granule cell; spermatocyte; hippocampus proper; striatum of neuraxis; More reference expression data
BioGPS	n/a
Gene ontology
Molecular function	RNA binding; mRNA binding
Cellular component	cytoplasm; endosome; postsynaptic membrane; cell projection; membrane; postsynaptic density; plasma membrane; dendritic spine; synapse; cell junction; dendrite; acrosomal vesicle; actin cytoskeleton; cytoskeleton; cytoplasmic vesicle; cell cortex; early endosome membrane; soma; membrane raft; postsynaptic density membrane; postsynaptic endosome; glutamatergic synapse; extracellular vesicle
Biological process	endoderm development; endocytosis; positive regulation of AMPA receptor activity; learning; multicellular organism development; cytoskeleton organization; regulation of neuronal synaptic plasticity; regulation of cell morphogenesis; cell migration; anterior/posterior pattern specification; regulation of long-term synaptic potentiation; long-term memory; modulation of chemical synaptic transmission; mRNA transport; protein homooligomerization; long-term potentiation; dendritic spine morphogenesis; regulation of dendritic spine morphogenesis; regulation of postsynaptic neurotransmitter receptor internalization; vesicle-mediated intercellular transport; regulation of long-term synaptic depression
Sources:Amigo / QuickGO
Orthologs
Databases	NCBI: entry; OMA: entry
Species	Human	Mouse
Entrez	23237	11838
Ensembl	ENSG00000198576	ENSMUSG00000022602
UniProt	Q7LC44	Q9WV31
RefSeq (mRNA)	NM_015193	NM_001276684; NM_018790
RefSeq (protein)	NP_056008	NP_001263613; NP_061260
Location (UCSC)	Chr 8: 142.61 – 142.61 Mb	Chr 15: 74.54 – 74.54 Mb
PubMed search
- Wikidata
View/Edit Human	View/Edit Mouse

Activity-regulated cytoskeleton-associated protein is a plasticity protein that in humans is encoded by the ARC gene. The gene is believed to derive from a retrotransposon. The protein is found in the neurons of tetrapods and other animals where it can form virus-like capsids that transport RNA between neurons.

ARC mRNA is localized to activated synaptic sites in an NMDA receptor-dependent manner, where the newly translated protein is believed to play a critical role in learning and memory-related molecular processes. Arc protein is widely considered to be important in neurobiology because of its activity regulation, localization, and utility as a marker for plastic changes in the brain. Dysfunction in the production of Arc protein has been implicated as an important factor in understanding various neurological conditions, including amnesia, Alzheimer's disease, Autism spectrum disorders, and Fragile X syndrome.

ARC was first characterized in 1995 and is a member of the immediate-early gene (IEG) family, a rapidly activated class of genes functionally defined by their ability to be transcribed in the presence of protein synthesis inhibitors. Along with other IEGs such as ZNF268 and HOMER1, ARC is a significant tool for systems neuroscience as illustrated by the development of the cellular compartment analysis of temporal activity by fluorescence in situ hybridization, or catFISH technique (see fluorescent in situ hybridization).

== Gene ==
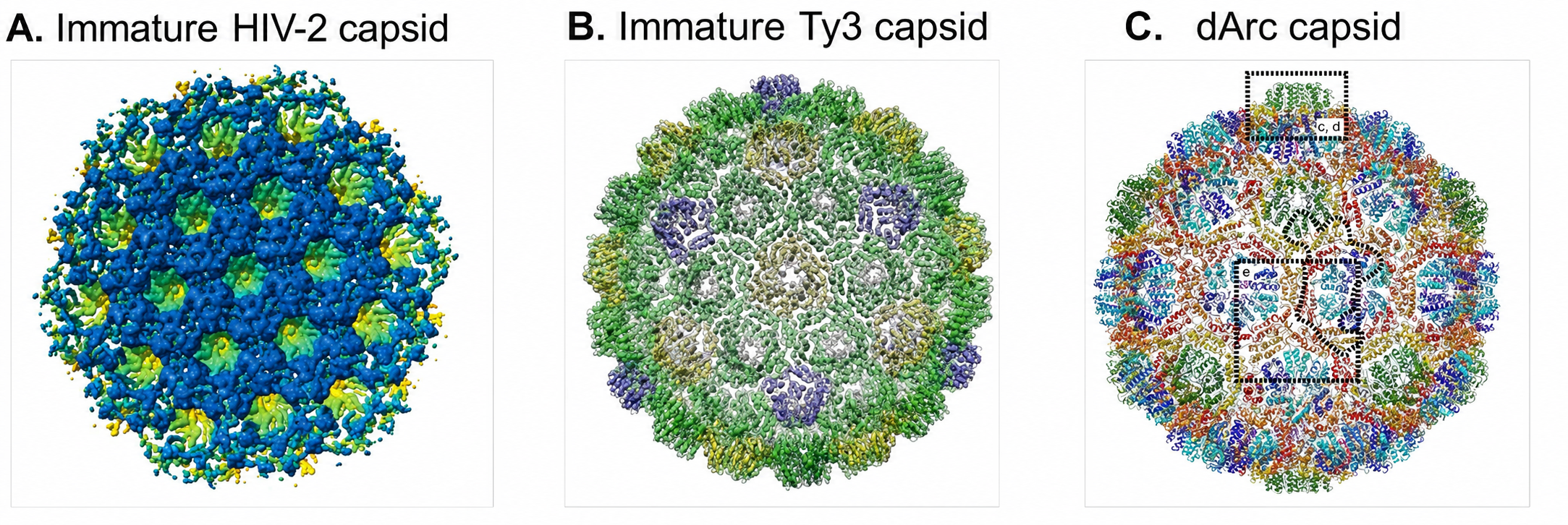
Comparison of ARC capsids with Ty3/gypsy retrotransposon and HIV2

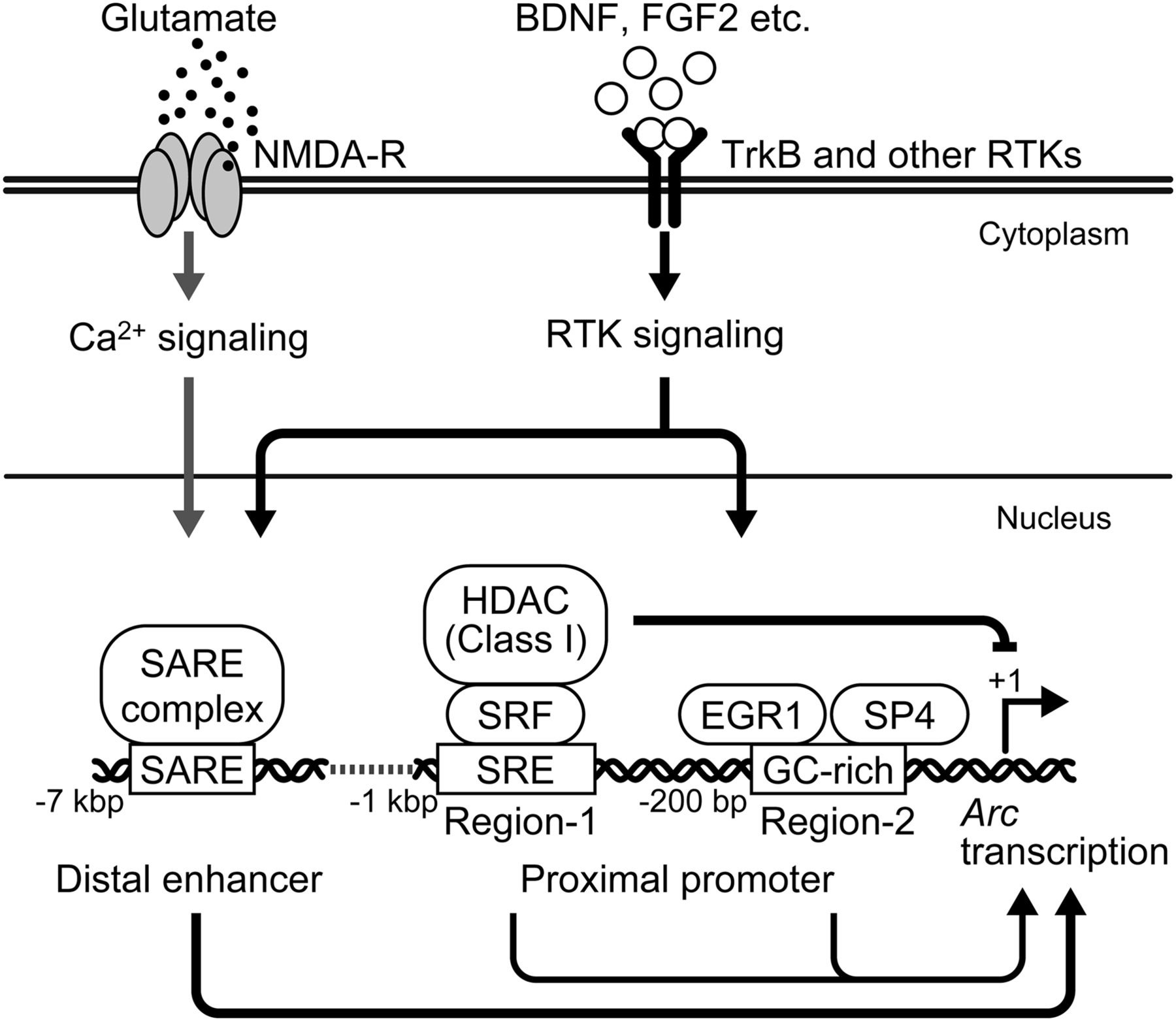
Model of ARC expression in neurons.

The ARC gene, located on chromosome 15 in the mouse, chromosome 7 in the rat, and chromosome 8 in the human, is conserved across vertebrate species and has low sequence homology to spectrin, a cytoskeletal protein involved in forming the actin cellular cortex. A number of promoter and enhancer regions have been identified that mediate activity-dependent Arc transcription: a serum response element (SRE; see serum response factor) at ~1.5 kb upstream of the initiation site. a second SRE at ~6.5 kb; and a synaptic activity response element (SARE) sequence at ~7 kb upstream that contains binding sites for cyclic AMP response element-binding protein (CREB), myocyte enhancer factor 2 (MEF2), and SRF.

The 3' UTR of the mRNA contains a cis-acting element required for the localization of Arc to neuronal dendrites, as well as sites for two exon junction complexes (EJCs) that make Arc a natural target for nonsense mediated decay (NMD). Also important for translocation of cytoplasmic Arc mRNA to activated synapses is an 11 nucleotide binding site for heterogeneous nuclear ribonucleoprotein A2 (hnRNP A2).

It is suspected that the ARC gene originated from the gag gene of a Ty3/gypsy retrotransposon and was repurposed for mediating neuron-neuron communication.

== Trafficking ==
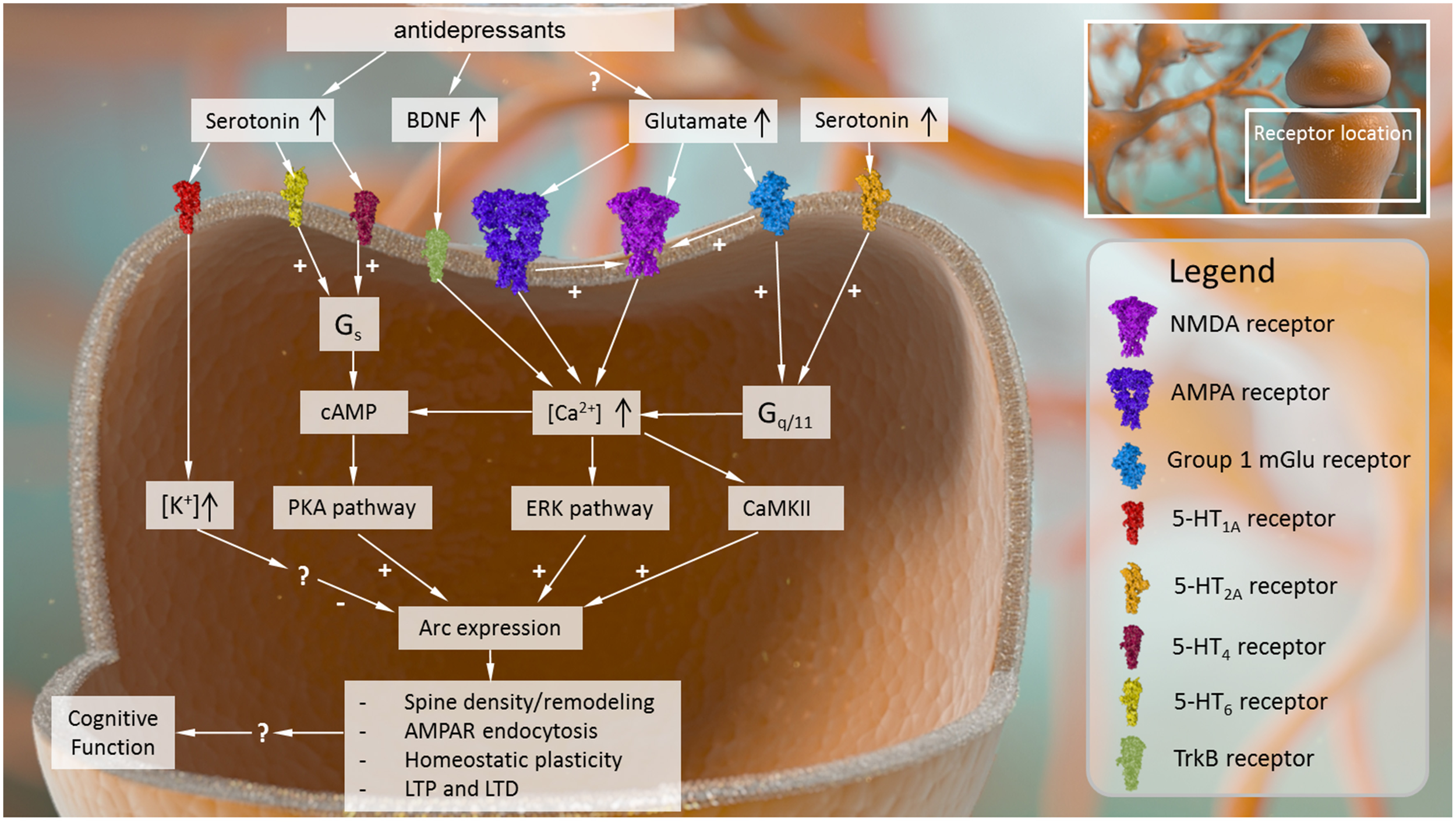
Mechanism of CNS Arc expression

Following transcription, Arc mRNA is transported out of the nucleus and localized to neuronal dendrites and activated synapses, a process dependent on the 3' UTR, polymerization of actin, and ERK phosphorylation. The mRNA (and aggregate protein) is carried along microtubules radiating out from the nucleus by kinesin (specifically KIF5) and likely translocated into dendritic spines by the actin-based motor protein myosin-Va. Arc has been shown to be associated with polyribosomes at synaptic sites, and is translated in isolated synaptoneurosomal fractions in vitro indicating that the protein is likely locally translated in vivo.

== Protein ==
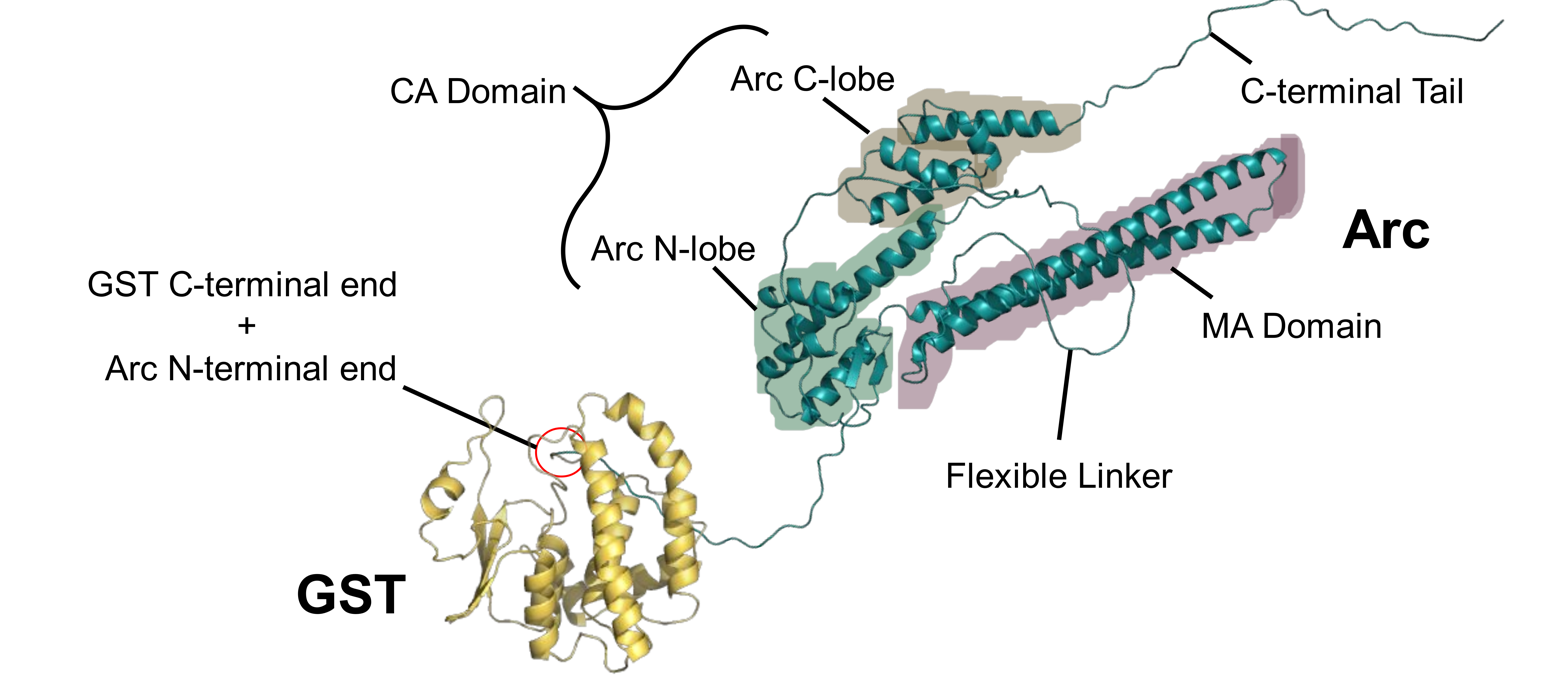
Rat Arc protein with a GST tag attached to ARC's N-terminal end

Once transported, the translated protein is 396 residues in length, with an N-terminus located at amino acids 1-25, a C-terminus at 155-396 (note that the spectrin homology located at 228-380 within the C-terminal), and a putative coiled coil domain at amino acids 26-154. Additionally, the protein has binding sites for endophilin 3 and dynamin 2 at amino acids 89-100 and 195-214, respectively. While Arc mRNA is subject to degradation by NMD, the translated protein contains a PEST sequence at amino acids 351-392, indicating proteasome-dependent degradation. The translated protein can be visualized with an immunoblot as a band at 55 kDa. The ARC protein can form virus-like capsids that package mRNA and can traffic between cells.

Synaptically localized Arc protein interacts with dynamin and endophilin, proteins involved in clathrin-mediated endocytosis, and facilitates the removal of AMPA receptors from the plasma membrane. Consistent with this, increased Arc levels reduce AMPA currents, while Arc KOs display increases in surface AMPA expression.

== Knockouts ==
Arc is critical as a ubiquitous signaling factor in early embryonic development and is required for growth and patterning during gastrulation. The first knockouts (KOs) for Arc were therefore incompatible with life. Subsequent efforts produced homozygous knockout mice by targeting the entire Arc gene rather than portions of the coding region, eliminating dominant negative effects. These animals proved viable and exhibit no gross malformations in neuronal architecture, but express higher levels of the GluR1 subunit and increased miniature excitatory postsynaptic currents (mEPSCs) in addition to displaying deficiencies in long-term memory.

== Signaling ==
The Arc transcript is dependent upon activation of the mitogen-activated protein kinase or MAP kinase (MAPK) cascade, a pathway important for regulation of cell growth and survival. Extracellular signaling to neuronal dendrites activates postsynaptic sites to increase Arc levels through a wide variety of signaling molecules, including mitogens such as epidermal growth factor (EGF), nerve growth factor (NGF), and brain-derived neurotrophic factor (BDNF), glutamate acting at NMDA receptors, dopamine through activation of the D1 receptor subtype, and dihydroxyphenylglycine (DHPG). The common factor for these signaling molecules involves activation of cyclic-AMP and its downstream target protein kinase A (PKA). As such, direct pharmacological activation of cAMP by forskolin or 8-Br-cAMP robustly increases Arc levels while H89, a PKA antagonist, blocks these effects as does further downstream blockade of mitogen-activated protein kinase kinase [sic] (MEK). Note that the MAPK cascade is a signaling pathway involving multiple kinases acting sequentially [MAPKKK→ MAPKK→ MAPK].

MAPK is able to enter the nucleus and perform its phosphotransferase activity on a number of gene regulatory components that have implications for the regulation of immediate-early genes. Several transcription factors are known to be involved in regulating the Arc gene (see above), including serum response factor (SRF), CREB, MEF2, and zif268.

== Behavioral effects ==
Changes in Arc mRNA and/or protein are correlated with a number of behavioral changes including cued fear conditioning, contextual fear conditioning, spatial memory, operant conditioning, and inhibitory avoidance. The mRNA is notably upregulated following electrical stimulation in LTP-induction procedures such as high frequency stimulation (HFS), and is massively and globally induced by maximal electroconvulsive shock (MECS).

== Arc in insects ==
It has been found that Arc may have been acquired by animals more than once. While Arc seems to be closely related among all tetrapods, the versions of Arc found in fruit flies (Drosophila melanogaster), silkworms (Bombyx mori), and Argentine ants (Linepithema humile) may have been transferred to a common ancestor of these insects by another event.
