= NXPH3 =

Protein-coding gene in the species Homo sapiens

Identifiers
- Aliases: NXPH3, NPH3, neurexophilin 3
- External IDs: OMIM: 604636; MGI: 1336188; GeneCards: NXPH3

Gene location (Human)
Chr.	Chromosome 17 (human)
Band	17q21.33	Start	49,575,871 bp
Band	17q21.33	End	49,583,827 bp

Gene location (Mouse)
Chr.	Chromosome 11 (mouse)
Band	11|11 D	Start	95,400,671 bp
Band	11|11 D	End	95,405,396 bp
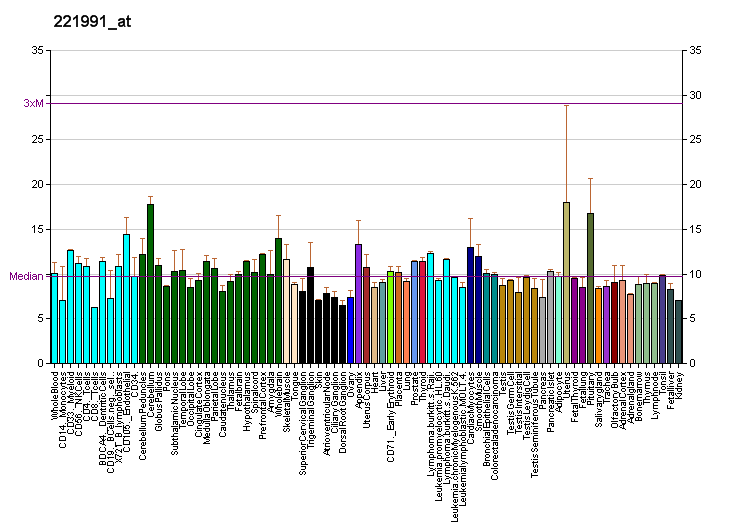
RNA expression pattern
Bgee	Human / Mouse (ortholog); Top expressed in: ascending aorta; Descending thoracic aorta; vena cava; saphenous vein; right coronary artery; cerebellar hemisphere; popliteal artery; tibial arteries; right hemisphere of cerebellum; pons / Top expressed in: olfactory epithelium; visual cortex; primary visual cortex; urethra; female urethra; male urethra; temporal muscle; carotid body; superior frontal gyrus; vastus lateralis muscle; More reference expression data
BioGPS	More reference expression data
Gene ontology
Molecular function	signaling receptor binding; molecular function
Cellular component	extracellular region
Biological process	neuropeptide signaling pathway
Sources:Amigo / QuickGO
Orthologs
Databases	NCBI: entry; OMA: entry
Species	Human	Mouse
Entrez	11248	104079
Ensembl	ENSG00000182575	ENSMUSG00000046719
UniProt	O95157	Q91VX5
RefSeq (mRNA)	NM_007225	NM_130858
RefSeq (protein)	NP_009156	NP_570928
Location (UCSC)	Chr 17: 49.58 – 49.58 Mb	Chr 11: 95.4 – 95.41 Mb
PubMed search
- Wikidata
View/Edit Human	View/Edit Mouse

Neurexophilin-3 is a protein that in humans is encoded by the NXPH3 gene.

== See also ==
- NXPH1
