= NXPH1 =

Protein-coding gene in the species Homo sapiens

Identifiers
- Aliases: NXPH1, NPH1, Nbla00697, neurexophilin 1
- External IDs: OMIM: 604639; MGI: 107492; GeneCards: NXPH1

Gene location (Human)
Chr.	Chromosome 7 (human)
Band	7p21.3	Start	8,433,609 bp
Band	7p21.3	End	8,752,961 bp

Gene location (Mouse)
Chr.	Chromosome 6 (mouse)
Band	6|6 A1	Start	8,948,431 bp
Band	6|6 A1	End	9,249,032 bp
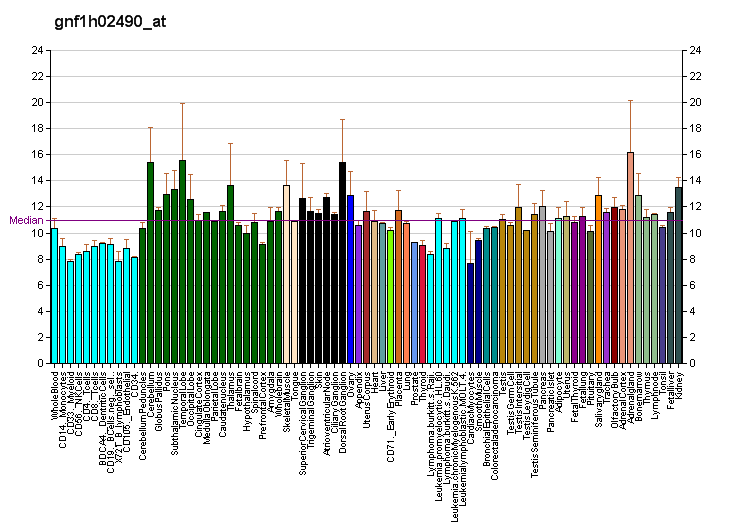
RNA expression pattern
Bgee	Human / Mouse (ortholog); Top expressed in: right adrenal cortex; endothelial cell; secondary oocyte; prefrontal cortex; testicle; left adrenal gland; left adrenal cortex; hypothalamus; cingulate gyrus; anterior cingulate cortex / Top expressed in: lateral septal nucleus; medial dorsal nucleus; dorsomedial hypothalamic nucleus; ventral tegmental area; anterior amygdaloid area; dorsal tegmental nucleus; medial vestibular nucleus; habenula; lumbar subsegment of spinal cord; ventromedial nucleus; More reference expression data
BioGPS	More reference expression data
Orthologs
Databases	NCBI: entry; OMA: entry
Species	Human	Mouse
Entrez	30010	18231
Ensembl	ENSG00000122584	ENSMUSG00000046178
UniProt	P58417	Q61200
RefSeq (mRNA)	NM_152745	NM_008751
RefSeq (protein)	NP_689958	NP_032777
Location (UCSC)	Chr 7: 8.43 – 8.75 Mb	Chr 6: 8.95 – 9.25 Mb
PubMed search
- Wikidata
View/Edit Human	View/Edit Mouse

Neurexophilin-1 is a protein that in humans is encoded by the NXPH1 gene.

This gene is a member of the neurexophilin family and encodes a secreted protein with a variable N-terminal domain, a highly conserved, N-glycosylated central domain, a short linker region, and a cysteine-rich C-terminal domain. This protein forms a very tight complex with alpha neurexins, a group of proteins that promote adhesion between dendrites and axons.
