= Inflammaging =

Chronic low-grade inflammation that develops with advanced age

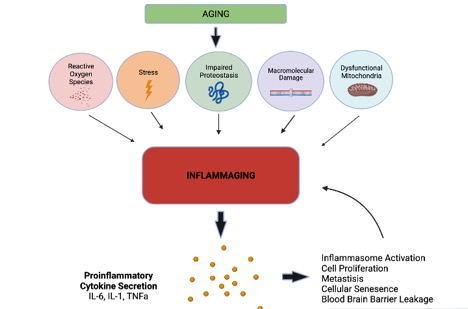
Factors involved in inflammaging: Aging leads to perturbations in cellular homeostasis leading to inflammaging that results in pro-inflammatory cytokine secretion.

Inflammaging (also known as inflamm-aging or inflamm-ageing) is a chronic, sterile, low-grade inflammation that develops with advanced age, in the absence of overt infection, and may contribute to clinical manifestations of other age-related pathologies. Inflammaging is thought to be caused by a loss of control over systemic inflammation resulting in chronic overstimulation of the innate immune system. Inflammaging is a significant risk factor in mortality and morbidity in aged individuals.

Inflammation is essential to protect against viral and bacterial infection, as well as noxious stimuli. It is an integral part of the healing process, though prolonged inflammation can be detrimental. The network dynamics of inflammation change with age, and factors such as genes, lifestyle, and environment contribute to these changes. Current research studying inflammaging is focused on understanding the interaction of dynamic molecular pathways underlying both aging and inflammation and how they change with chronological age.

== Characteristics ==
Fine control and modulation of the immune system response becomes fragile and less precise with age, as seen with other bodily systems. Remodeling of the immune system in the elderly is thought to be characterized by an inability to control systemic inflammation. With age, the number of lymphocytes being produced decreases, and the composition and quality of the mature lymphocyte pool changes. While the effectiveness of adaptive immune system declines, innate immune mechanisms become overactive and less precise, leading to an increase in pro-inflammatory phenotypes that contributes to "inflammaging." The secretome of senescent mesenchymal stem and stromal cells (MSCs) exhibits immunomodulatory effects and serves as a driver in inflammaging-related diseases. All together, this contribues to a less efficient immune system response to pathogens and chronic, systemic inflammatory phenotypes.

== Causes ==
Inflammaging is a complex and systemic issue, likely a result of several factors.

=== Inflammasome activation ===
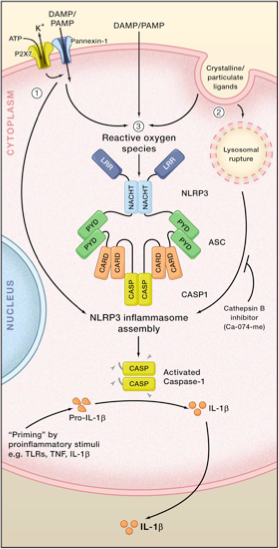
Inflammasome activation and assembly: Release of ROS and pro-inflammatory cytokine secretion in response to inflammasome assembly after DAMP / PAMP binding

Over-activation of the inflammasome is one mechanism contributing to inflammaging. The inflammasome is a multi-protein complex consisting of a sensor, an adapter, and an effector, that when activated, modulates caspases which cleave cytokines and result in an inflammatory signaling response. Receptors present on the cell surface act as sensors for the detection of damage and pathogens. When activated, this system can go on to elicit pro-inflammatory cytokine secretion and sometimes cell death. Pro-inflammatory cytokines secretion acts as the effector or the response to such stimuli.

Stimuli that can fuel inflammasome assembly include pathogen-associated molecular patterns (PAMPS), damage associated molecular patterns (DAMPS), nutrients, and the microbiota. These various self, non-self, and quasi self molecules are recognized by receptors of innate immune cells, whose promiscuity allows for many different signals to lead to activation and consequently to inflammation. Examples of stimuli that act as PAMPS include viral and bacterial infection, such as cytomegalovirus and periodontitis, respectively. Examples of DAMPS include misfolded and oxidized proteins, cell debris, and self nucleic acids.

=== Generation of reactive oxygen species ===
In addition to inflammasome activation, with age, cellular components accumulate reactive oxygen species (ROS). These free radicals can damage DNA, lipid, and protein and is able to drive cellular senescence. This is accompanied by a loss in efficiency of DNA damage repair mechanisms. This results in pro-inflammatory cytokine secretion, which contributes to low grade, chronic inflammation in the absence of pathogen or damage, but rather in response to damaged self molecules like oxidized nucleotides.

=== SASP phenotype ===
Senescent cell populations increase with age and secrete a pro-inflammatory cocktail of chemicals, a condition known as senescence-associated secretory phenotype (SASP). Cells with the SASP are characterized by being in cell cycle arrest, releasing inflammatory factors, and possessing a particular morphology. These cells promote tissue degeneration and are able to spread to other regions by way of the inflammatory secretory molecules released. This contributes to inflammaging as inflammatory secretion contributes to innate immune activation and exhaustion.

=== Functional decline in autophagy and mitophagy ===
Another contribution to inflammaging is a decline in effective autophagy and mitophagy capacity. This is an essential process for cellular housekeeping that prevents protein aggregation and accumulation of damaged mitochondria that produce large quantities of reactive oxygen species. A loss of effective autophagic processes leads to aggregation of damaged proteins. As inflammasome precision declines with age, these aggregates, normally degraded, can be recognizes as a pathogen and lead to an inflammatory response. This contributes to inflammaging and is also involved in many neurodegenerative diseases as well.

=== Other factors ===
Other possible factors that may lead to inflamm-aging include insufficient sleep, overnutrition, sensory overload, physical inactivity, altered gut microbiome, impaired intestinal epithelial barrier, and chronic stress occurring in any stage of the individual's life. Cytokines with inflammatory properties can also be secreted by fat tissue.

== Biomarkers of inflammaging ==
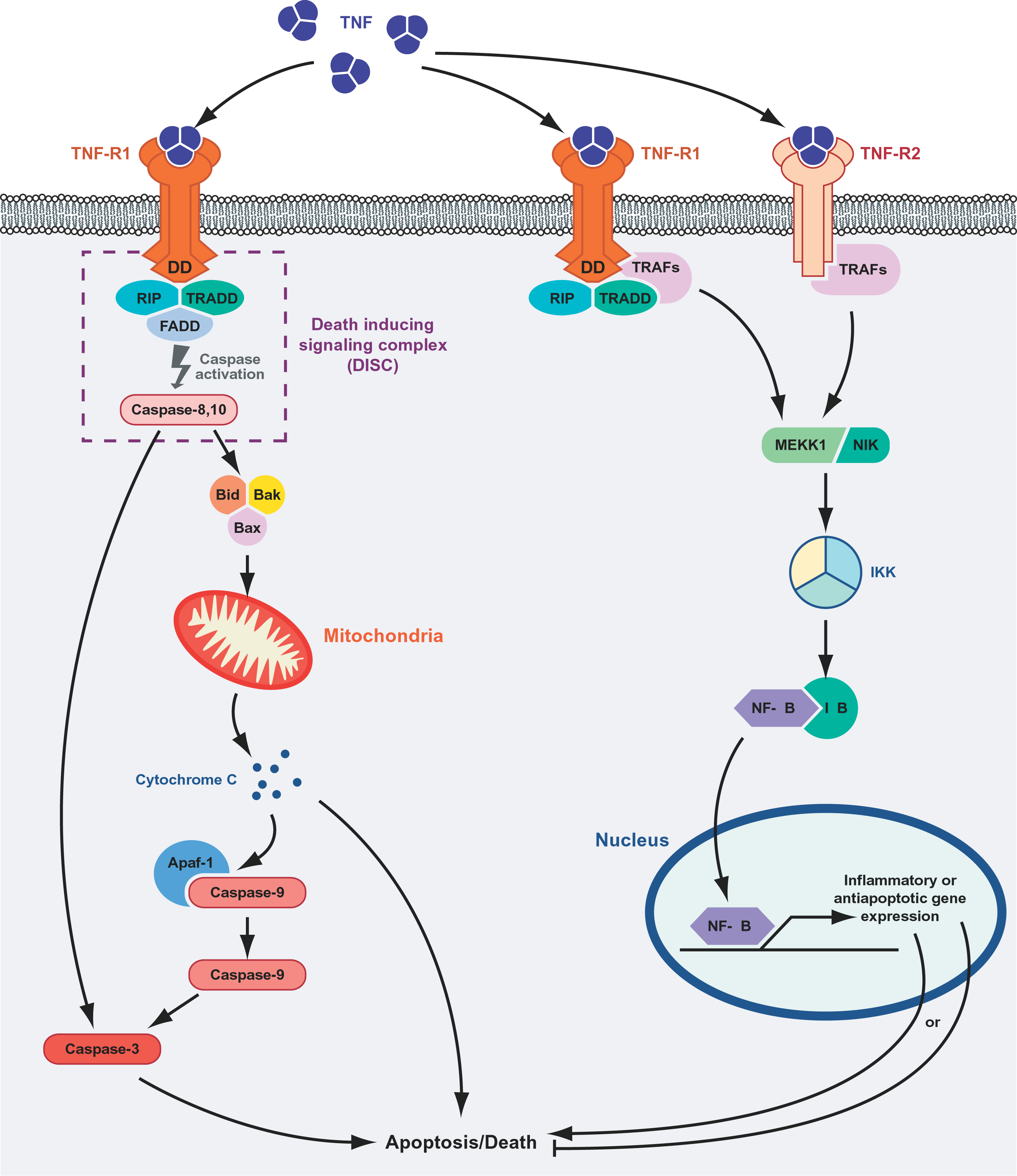
TNF mediated cell survival and death pathway: TNF binding to receptors induces apoptosis and necrosis through various signaling pathways.

Cytokines are currently used as biomarkers of inflammaging as they are indicative of inflammation and play a large role in the regulation of pro and anti-inflammatory immune regulation. Cytokines are small proteins that are secreted by many cell types that are very relevant in the study of aging and longevity. Aging studies show that a healthy balance of pro and anti-inflammatory cytokine secretion is associated with successful aging whereas dysregulation of this system results in inflammaging, poor aging phenotypes, and other aging-related diseases. Currently, levels of TNF, IL-6 and IL-1 can be used as inflammatory biomarkers that indicate frailty, an altered immune system, functional decline and mortality associated with inflammaging .

Biomarkers of immuno-senescence also exist and involved changes to T cells, CD4/CD8 ratios as well as the SASP phenotype. Altogether, these biomarkers may not be translationally relevant to clinical outcomes. The generation of more reliable biomarkers of inflammation and aging is of interest in current research.

=== Interleukin 6 ===
IL-6 is pro-inflammatory in nature and can be produced by many cells of the immune system as well as non-immune cells, like fibroblasts. This cytokine has been identified in many organs such as the lungs, adipose tissue, muscle, and brain. The concentration of this cytokine is usually very low or non-detectable in young adults though levels increase in old age and are very high in the elderly. Moreover, elevated IL-6 has also been associated with disability and mortality in older adults. High serum levels are associated with cognitive impairment, low locomotion, and depression.

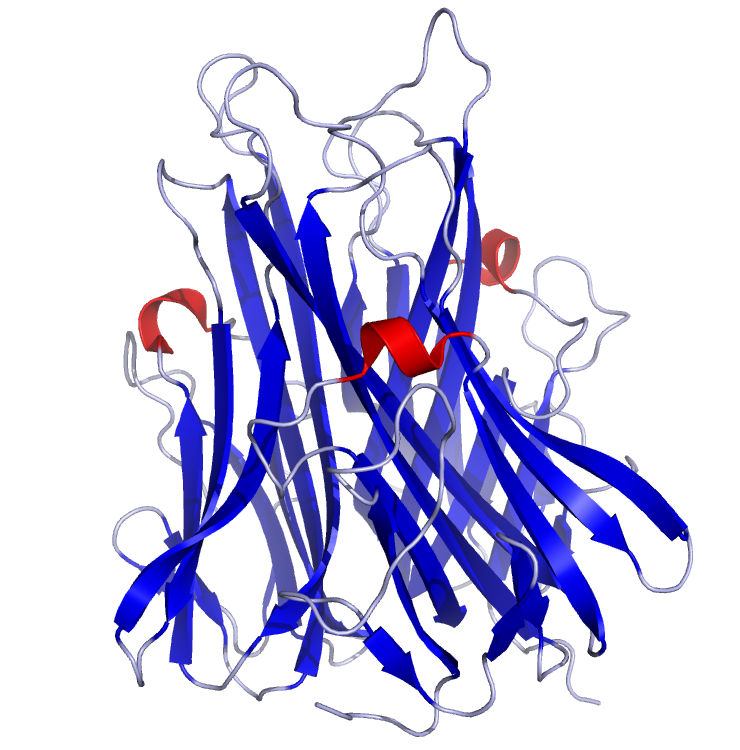
Crystal protein structure of tumor necrosis factor.

=== Interleukin 1 ===
The interleukin 1 family consists of both pro and anti inflammatory mediators and there are 9 genes that encode different forms of interleukin 1, like Il-1a and IL-1B. IL-1B is one of the most prominent mediators of inflammation and its secretion is tightly regulated given its potent nature. IL-1B starts in an inactive form and is induced first by toll like receptors or TNF and requires a second stimulus by the inflammasome to induce the mature, active form of IL-1B.

=== Tumor necrosis factor ===
Tumor necrosis factor (TNF) is an inflammatory cytokine produced upon acute inflammation and is an important signaling molecule responsible for inducing apoptosis or necrosis. TNF exerts its effects by binding to various membrane receptors that belong to the TNF Receptor superfamily. With age, TNF serum levels negatively correlate with T cell function. Additionally, elevated TNF levels are associated with increased systemic inflammation and contribute to inflammatory diseases like rheumatoid arthritis. TNF signaling is thought to be up-regulated during inflammaging and contributes to cellular senescence and immune exhaustion.

== Evolutionary consideration ==
While inflammation is capable of having negative implications, evolutionarily insight explains how inflammation has served as a layer of protection. It has been proposed that immune, metabolic, and endocrine systems co-evolved.

In prehistoric times, starvation and infection by a pathogen pose as severe risks to survival. Inflammation may have served a protective role in human survival when food and water were scarce and highly contaminated. This explains post prandial inflammation, which involves innate immune system activation after ingesting a meal. Additionally, during infection by a pathogen, leptin synthesis changes and a reduction in food intake occurs. This is to decrease the likelihood of ingesting another pathogen as well as preserving receptors critical for pathogen sensing, from sensing pathogenic nutrients instead. Perhaps, this is another reason calorie restriction is beneficial in the treatment of inflammaging.

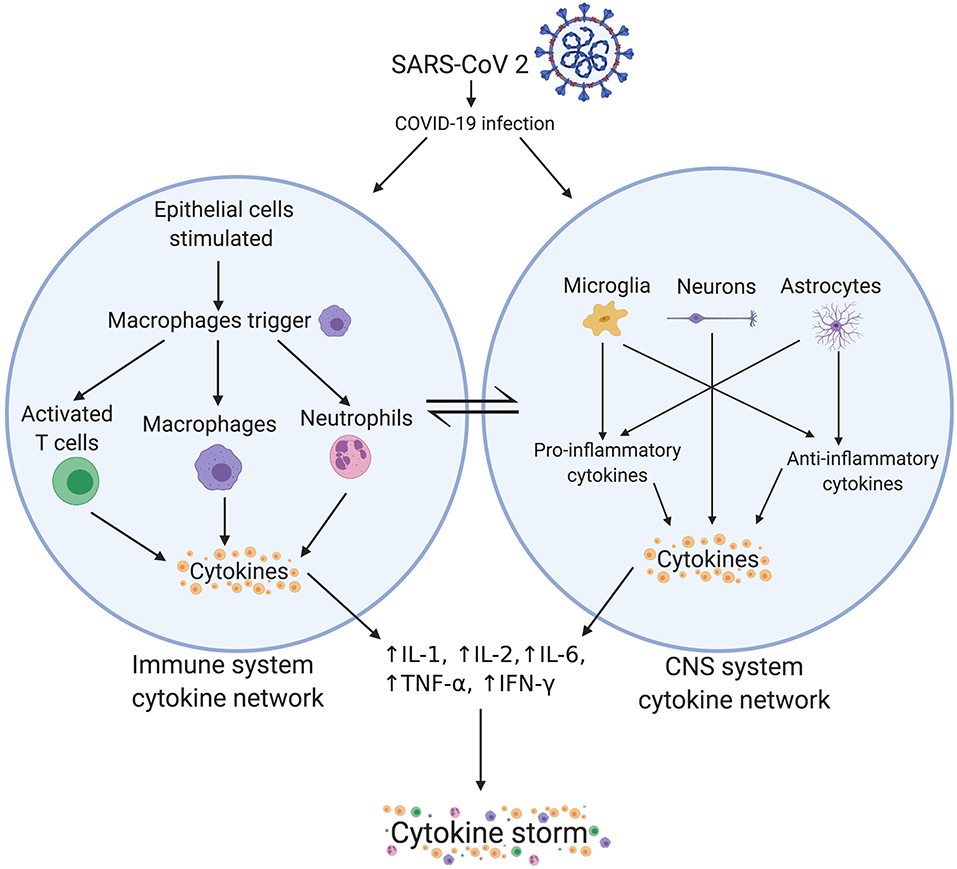
Cytokine storm induced by SARS-CoV2 infection: Infection by SARS-COV 2 leads to COVID-19 Infection resulting in activation of inflammatory phenotypes by cell types in both the central nervous system and within the immune system network

These same inflammatory processes may be detrimental towards humans in current society where over-nutrition is readily available. While inflammatory adaptations have evolved to promote survival in times of food deprivation, it does not appear that such adaptations have evolved in periods of over-nutrition. In current times, natural selection does not favor those who are spared from inflammaging, as this occurs at ages past the reproduction window.

== Inflammaging and COVID-19 ==
Adaptive immunity, involving the ability to fight off pathogens, declines with age. Chronic inflammation and immunosenescence, which both increase with advanced chronological age, renders the elderly population more vulnerable to adverse, long term effects of viral infection by SARS-CoV2. Inflammaging alone contributes to pro-inflammatory cytokine secretion that, in combination with viral infection by SARS-CoV2, may exhaust immune system function, contributing to worse outcomes when fighting COVID-19.

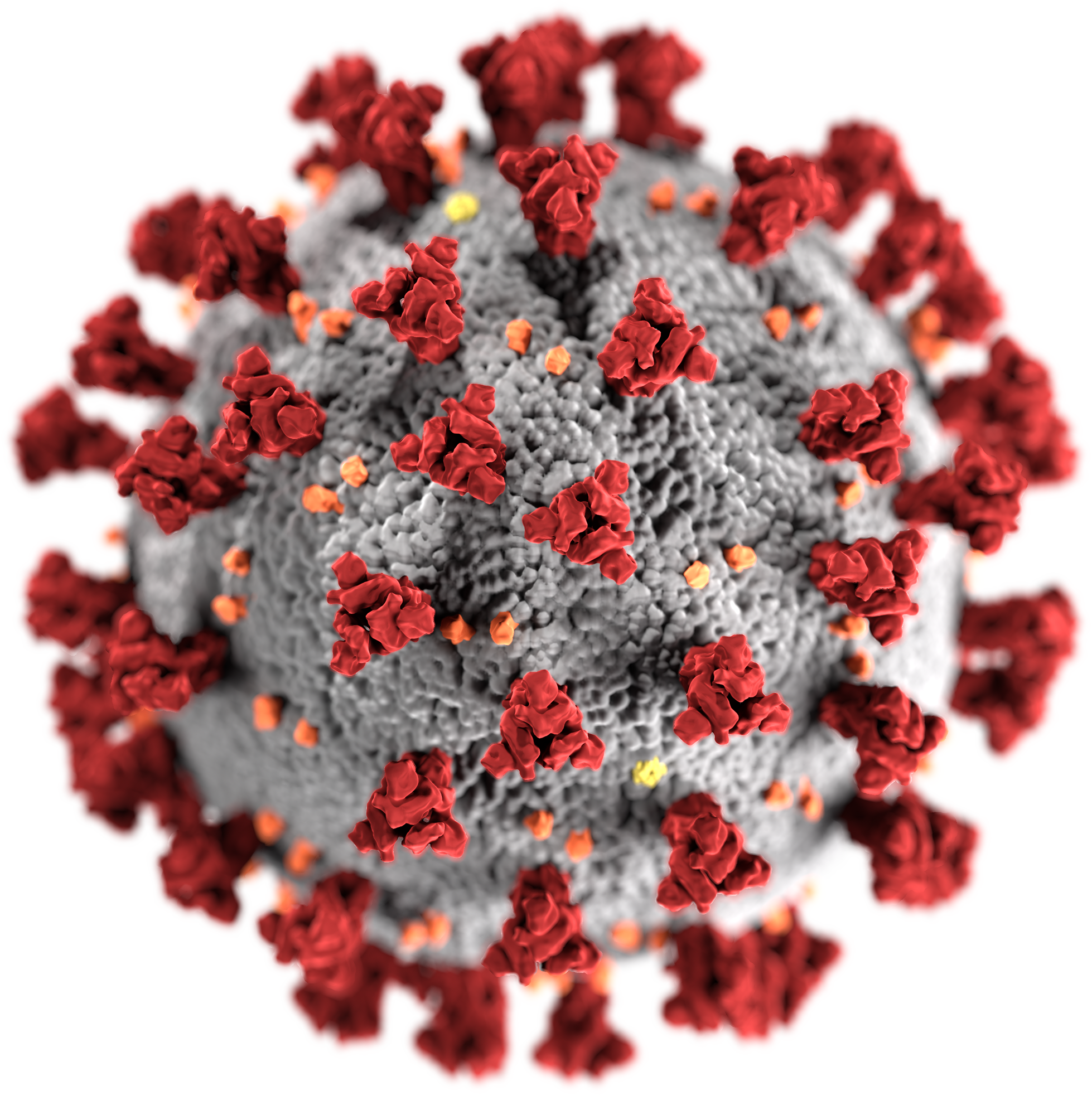
SARS-CoV2 virus: Coronavirus resulting in COVID-19

Available evidence indicates that SARS-CoV2 enters the central nervous system through the lymphatic system and the virus was confirmed present in the capillaries and neuronal cells of the frontal lobe of COVID-19 patients. This is corroborated with evidence demonstrating that SARS-CoV2 was present in cerebral spinal fluid of infected patients which displayed severe neurological symptoms. Viral infection is capable of inducing neuroinflammation through neuro-immune interactions. While aging is the most significant risk factor in the development of neurodegenerative diseases like Alzheimers, Parkinson's, and Amyotrophic lateral sclerosis, chronic, low-grade inflammation and immunosenescence may be aggravated by a viral infection, worsening the aging phenotype and contributing to the development of neurodegenerative disease. For example, neuroinflammation has been shown to contribute greatly to the severity and pathogenesis of Parkinson's disease. Infection by the H1N1 virus was shown to contribute to Parkinson's disease development.

Inflammaging and COVID-19 infection may lead to worse outcomes and contribute to the development of neurodegenerative disease in aged individuals.

== Cardiovascular diseases ==
Inflammaging has been linked to a higher risk of cardiovascular diseases and has been increasingly recognized as a determinant of cardiovascular outcome.
