= MiR-146 =

Family of microRNA precursors

miR-146
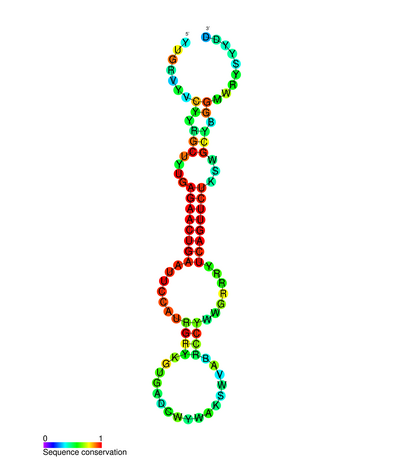
- Conserved secondary structure of miR-146 microRNA precursor

Identifiers
- Symbol: miR-146
- Alt. Symbols: MIR146
- Rfam: RF00691
- miRBase: MI0000477
- miRBase family: MIPF0000103
- NCBI Gene: 406938
- HGNC: 31533
- OMIM: 610566
- RefSeq: NR_029897

Other data
- RNA type: miRNA
- Domain: Mammalia
- GO: 0035195
- SO: 0001244
- Locus: Chr. 5 q34
- PDB structures: PDBe

miR-146 is a family of microRNA precursors found in mammals, including humans. The ~22 nucleotide mature miRNA sequence is excised from the precursor hairpin by the enzyme Dicer. This sequence then associates with RISC which effects RNA interference.

miR-146 is primarily involved in the regulation of inflammation and other process that function in the innate immune system. Loss of functional miR-146 (and mir-145) could predispose an individual to chromosome 5q deletion syndrome. miR-146 has also been reported to be highly upregulated in osteoarthritis cartilage, and could be involved in its pathogenesis. mir-146 expression is associated with survival in triple negative breast cancer.

== Function ==
miR-146 is thought to be a mediator of inflammation along with another microRNA, mir-155. The expression of miR-146 is upregulated by inflammatory factors such as interleukin 1 and tumor necrosis factor-alpha. miR-146 dysregulates a number of targets which are mostly involved in toll-like receptor pathways that bring about a cytokine response as part of the innate immune system. miR-146 operates in a feedback system or "negative regulatory loop" to finely tune inflammatory responses.

== Applications ==
miR-146 could be used as a biomarker for sepsis. In addition it was found to be absent from the exosomes of prion infected cells suggesting it could be used as a biomarker for prion infection. miR-146a could be targeted therapeutically as its depletion has implication in the hyperactive response to infection.

== See also ==
- microRNA (miRNA)
