= SECTM1 =

Protein-coding gene in the species Homo sapiens

Identifiers
- Aliases: SECTM1, K12, secreted and transmembrane 1, SECTM
- External IDs: OMIM: 602602; MGI: 2384805; HomoloGene: 134112; GeneCards: SECTM1; OMA:SECTM1 - orthologs

Gene location (Human)
Chr.	Chromosome 17 (human)
Band	17q25.3	Start	82,321,024 bp
Band	17q25.3	End	82,334,074 bp

Gene location (Mouse)
Chr.	Chromosome 11 (mouse)
Band	11|11 E2	Start	120,958,233 bp
Band	11|11 E2	End	120,972,046 bp
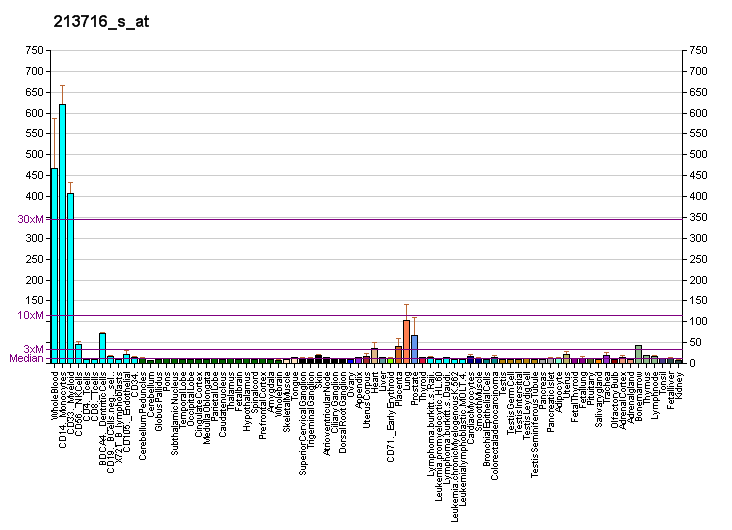
RNA expression pattern
Bgee	Human / Mouse (ortholog); Top expressed in: monocyte; granulocyte; blood; mucosa of transverse colon; mucosa of ileum; jejunal mucosa; duodenum; spleen; appendix; decidua / Top expressed in: skin of external ear; epithelium of stomach; epithelium of small intestine; seminal vesicula; mucous cell of stomach; lip; right kidney; duodenum; jejunum; spermatid; More reference expression data
BioGPS	More reference expression data
Gene ontology
Molecular function	signal transducer activity; cytokine activity
Cellular component	extracellular region; Golgi apparatus; plasma membrane; membrane; extracellular exosome; integral component of membrane; extracellular space
Biological process	mesoderm development; positive regulation of I-kappaB kinase/NF-kappaB signaling; immune response; signal transduction; regulation of signaling receptor activity
Sources:Amigo / QuickGO
Orthologs
Species	Human	Mouse
Entrez	6398	209588
Ensembl	ENSG00000141574	ENSMUSG00000025165
UniProt	Q8WVN6	Q921W8
RefSeq (mRNA)	NM_003004	NM_145373
RefSeq (protein)	NP_002995	n/a
Location (UCSC)	Chr 17: 82.32 – 82.33 Mb	Chr 11: 120.96 – 120.97 Mb
PubMed search
- Wikidata
View/Edit Human	View/Edit Mouse

Secreted and transmembrane protein 1 is a protein that in humans is encoded by the SECTM1 gene.

This gene encodes a transmembrane and secreted protein with characteristics of a type 1a transmembrane protein. It is found in a perinuclear Golgi-like pattern and thought to be involved in hematopoietic and/or immune system processes.
