= Senescence-associated secretory phenotype =

Phenotype of senescent cells which secrete certain substances

Senescence-associated secretory phenotype (SASP) is a phenotype associated with senescent cells wherein those cells secrete high levels of inflammatory cytokines, immune modulators, growth factors, and proteases. SASP may also consist of exosomes and ectosomes containing enzymes, microRNA, DNA fragments, chemokines, and other bioactive factors. Soluble urokinase plasminogen activator surface receptor is part of SASP, and has been used to identify senescent cells for senolytic therapy. Initially, SASP is immunosuppressive (characterized by TGF-β1 and TGF-β3) and profibrotic, but progresses to become proinflammatory (characterized by IL-1β, IL-6 and IL-8) and fibrolytic. SASP is the primary cause of the detrimental effects of senescent cells.

SASP is heterogenous, with the exact composition dependent upon the senescent-cell inducer and the cell type. Interleukin 12 (IL-12) and Interleukin 10 (IL-10) are increased more than 200-fold in replicative senescence in contrast to stress-induced senescence or proteosome-inhibited senescence where the increases are about 30-fold or less. Tumor necrosis factor (TNF) is increased 32-fold in stress-induced senescence, 8-fold in replicative senescence, and only slightly in proteosome-inhibited senescence. Interleukin 6 (IL-6) and interleukin 8 (IL-8) are the most conserved and robust features of SASP. But some SASP components are anti-inflammatory.

Senescence and SASP can also occur in post-mitotic cells, notably neurons. The SASP in senescent neurons can vary according to cell type, the initiator of senescence, and the stage of senescence.

An online SASP Atlas serves as a guide to the various types of SASP.

SASP is one of the three main features of senescent cells, the other two features being arrested cell growth, and resistance to apoptosis. SASP factors can include the anti-apoptotic protein Bcl-xL, but growth arrest and SASP production are independently regulated. Although SASP from senescent cells can kill neighboring normal cells, the apoptosis-resistance of senescent cells protects those cells from SASP.

== History ==
The concept was first established in the late eighties by Dr. Michael D. West. Dr. West has, through collaboration with Geron, Inc. later funded work in Judith Campisi's lab to create a cell-based screen for drugs that inhibit the phenotype. Campisi subsequently named the phenotype SASP.

== Causes ==
SASP expression is induced by a number of transcription factors, including MLL1 (KMT2A), C/EBPβ, and NF-κB. NF-κB has been referred to as the master transcription factor controlling SASP expression. NF-κB and the enzyme CD38 are mutually activating. NF-κB is expressed as a result of inhibition of autophagy-mediated degradation of the transcription factor GATA4. GATA4 is activated by the DNA damage response factors, which induce cellular senescence. SASP is both a promoter of DNA damage response and a consequence of DNA damage response, in an autocrine and paracrine manner. Aberrant oncogenes, DNA damage, and oxidative stress induce mitogen-activated protein kinases, which are the upstream regulators of NF-κB.

Demethylation of DNA packaging protein Histone H3 (H3K27me3) can lead to up-regulation of genes controlling SASP.

mTOR (mammalian target of rapamycin) is also a key initiator of SASP. Interleukin 1 alpha (IL1A) is found on the surface of senescent cells, where it contributes to the production of SASP factors due to a positive feedback loop with NF-κB. Translation of mRNA for IL1A is highly dependent upon mTOR activity. mTOR activity increases levels of IL1A, mediated by MAPKAPK2. mTOR inhibition of ZFP36L1 prevents this protein from degrading transcripts of numerous components of SASP factors. Inhibition of mTOR supports autophagy, which can generate SASP components.

Ribosomal DNA (rDNA) is more vulnerable to DNA damage than DNA elsewhere in the genome such that rDNA instability can lead to cellular senescence, and thus to SASP The high-mobility group proteins (HMGA) can induce senescence and SASP in a p53-dependent manner.

Activation of the retrotransposon LINE1 can result in cytosolic DNA that activates the cGAS–STING cytosolic DNA sensing pathway upregulating SASP by induction of interferon type I. cGAS is essential for induction of cellular senescence by DNA damage, as could happen due to nascent cancer cells,

BAX and BAK cause micropores in the mitochondrial membrane resulting in leaking of mitochondrial RNA into the cytosol, inducing SASP. Senescent cells release mitochondrial double-stranded RNA (mt-dsRNA) into the cytosol driving the SASP via RIGI/MDA5/MAVS/MFN1. Moreover, senescent cells are hypersensitive to mt-dsRNA-driven inflammation due to reduced levels of PNPT1 and ADAR1.

SASP secretion can also be initiated by the microRNAs miR-146 a/b.

== Pathology ==
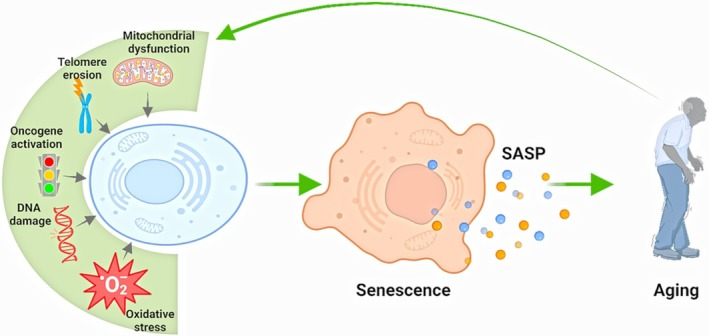
SASPs in glial cell senescence

The composition and destructiveness of SASP depends upon the senescent cell type, the surrounding microenvironment, and the type of stimulus inducing the senescence.

Senescent cells are highly metabolically active, producing large amounts of SASP, which is why senescent cells consisting of only 2% or 3% of tissue cells can be a major cause of aging-associated diseases. SASP factors cause non-senescent cells to become senescent. SASP factors induce insulin resistance. SASP disrupts normal tissue function by producing chronic inflammation, induction of fibrosis and inhibition of stem cells. Transforming growth factor beta family members secreted by senescent cells impede differentiation of adipocytes, leading to insulin resistance.

SASP factors IL-6 and TNFα enhance T-cell apoptosis, thereby impairing the capacity of the adaptive immune system.

SASP factors from senescent cells reduce nicotinamide adenine dinucleotide (NAD+) in non-senescent cells, thereby reducing the capacity for DNA repair and sirtuin activity in non-senescent cells. SASP induction of the NAD+ degrading enzyme CD38 on non-senescent cells (macrophages) may be responsible for most of this effect. By contrast, NAD+ contributes to the secondary (pro-inflammatory) manifestation of SASP.

Aged macrophages have a marked increase in SASP components. Bone marrow mesenchymal stem cells have a higher level of cellular senescence in older persons, resulting in a SASP-induced inflammatory environment causing disruption of factors indispensable for lymphocyte survival.

SASP induces an unfolded protein response in the endoplasmic reticulum because of an accumulation of unfolded proteins, resulting in proteotoxic impairment of cell function.

SASP cytokines can result in an inflamed stem cell niche, leading to stem cell exhaustion and impaired stem cell function.

The pro-inflammatory environment generated by SASP factors accelerates the breakdown of extracellular matrix thereby worsening intervertebral disc degeneration (IVDD). AMPK/p53 senescence produces a completely different SASP than IL-1 (p16^{INK4a}) senescence, which is primarily responsible for IVDD. In IVDD, SASP is secreted by nucleus pulposus and annulus fibrosus cells, resulting in extracellular matrix degradation and extracellular inflammation. Senomorphics, but not senolytics have been found to alleviate symptoms without eliminating senescent cells.

SASP can either promote or inhibit cancer, depending on the SASP composition, notably including p53 status. Despite the fact that cellular senescence likely evolved as a means of protecting against cancer early in life, SASP promotes the development of late-life cancers. Cancer invasiveness is promoted primarily through the actions of the SASP factors metalloproteinase, chemokine, interleukin 6 (IL-6), and interleukin 8 (IL-8). In fact, SASP from senescent cells is associated with many aging-associated diseases, including not only cancer, but atherosclerosis and osteoarthritis. For this reason, senolytic therapy has been proposed as a generalized treatment for these and many other diseases. The flavonoid apigenin has been shown to strongly inhibit SASP production.

== Benefits ==
SASP can aid in signaling to immune cells for senescent cell clearance, with specific SASP factors secreted by senescent cells attracting and activating different components of both the innate and adaptive immune system. The SASP cytokine CCL2 (MCP1) recruits macrophages to remove cancer cells. Although transient expression of SASP can recruit immune system cells to eliminate cancer cells as well as senescent cells, chronic SASP promotes cancer. Senescent hematopoietic stem cells produce a SASP that induces an M1 polarization of macrophages which kills the senescent cells in a p53-dependent process.

Autophagy is upregulated to promote survival.

SASP factors can maintain senescent cells in their senescent state of growth arrest, thereby preventing cancerous transformation. Additionally, SASP secreted by cells that have become senescent because of stresses can induce senescence in adjoining cells subject to the same stresses, thereby reducing cancer risk.

SASP can play a beneficial role by promoting wound healing. SASP may play a role in tissue regeneration by signaling for senescent cell clearance by immune cells, allowing progenitor cells to repopulate tissue. In development, SASP also may be used to signal for senescent cell clearance to aid tissue remodeling. The ability of SASP to clear senescent cells and regenerate damaged tissue declines with age. In contrast to the persistent character of SASP in the chronic inflammation of multiple age-related diseases, beneficial SASP in wound healing is transitory. Temporary SASP in the liver or kidney can reduce fibrosis, but chronic SASP could lead to organ dysfunction.

== Modification ==
Senescent cells have permanently active mTORC1 irrespective of nutrients or growth factors, resulting in the continuous secretion of SASP. By inhibiting mTORC1, rapamycin reduces SASP production by senescent cells.

=== Regulation by CRISPRi ===
Recent genome-wide CRISPR interference (CRISPRi) screens have identified genes whose selective inhibition modulates specific components of the SASP during inflammation-induced senescence, such as that triggered by interleukin-6 (IL-6). These approaches have helped distinguish molecular regulators of replicative senescence from those involved in inflammatory senescence, providing new targets for studying aging-related pathways.

SASP has been reduced through inhibition of p38 mitogen-activated protein kinases and janus kinase.

The protein hnRNP A1 (heterogeneous nuclear ribonucleoprotein A1) antagonizes cellular senescence and induction of the SASP by stabilizing Oct-4 and sirtuin 1 mRNAs.

== SASP Index ==
A SASP index composed of 22 SASP factors has been used to evaluate treatment outcomes of late life depression. Higher SASP index scores corresponded to increased incidence of treatment failure, whereas no individual SASP factors were associated with treatment failure.

== Inflammaging ==
Chronic inflammation associated with aging has been termed inflammaging, although SASP may be only one of the possible causes of this condition. Chronic systemic inflammation is associated with aging-associated diseases. Senolytic agents have been recommended to counteract some of these effects. Chronic inflammation due to SASP can suppress immune system function, which is one reason elderly persons are more vulnerable to COVID-19.

== See also ==
- Cellular senescence

== For further reading ==
- Han X, Lei Q, Xie J, Liu H, Li J, Zhang X, et al. (November 2022). "Potential Regulators of the Senescence-Associated Secretory Phenotype During Senescence and Aging". The Journals of Gerontology. Series A, Biological Sciences and Medical Sciences. 77 (11): 2207–2218. doi:10.1093/gerona/glac097. PMID 35524726.
- Ohtani N (April 2022). "The roles and mechanisms of senescence-associated secretory phenotype (SASP): can it be controlled by senolysis?". Inflammation and Regeneration. 42 (1): 11. doi:10.1186/s41232-022-00197-8. PMC 8976373. PMID 35365245.
- Pan Y, Gu Z, Lyu Y, Yang Y, Chung M, Pan X, et al. (August 2022). "Link Between Senescence and Cell Fate: Senescence-Associated Secretory Phenotype and Its Effects on Stem Cell Fate Transition". Rejuvenation Research. 25 (4): 160–172. doi:10.1089/rej.2022.0021. PMID 35658548.
- Park M, Na J, Kwak SY, Park S, Kim H, Lee SJ, et al. (July 2022). "Zileuton Alleviates Radiation-Induced Cutaneous Ulcers via Inhibition of Senescence-Associated Secretory Phenotype in Rodents". International Journal of Molecular Sciences. 23 (15): 8390. doi:10.3390/ijms23158390. PMC 9369445. PMID 35955523.
