= Early growth response proteins =

Protein family

Early growth response proteins are a family of zinc finger transcription factors.

Members of the family include:

- EGR1, EGR2, EGR3 and EGR4
