= NAB1 =

Protein-coding gene in the species Homo sapiens

Available structures
PDB	Ortholog search: PDBe RCSB
PDB	List of PDB id codes 2YUF

Identifiers
- Aliases: NAB1, NGFI-A binding protein 1
- External IDs: OMIM: 600800; MGI: 107564; HomoloGene: 4352; GeneCards: NAB1; OMA:NAB1 - orthologs

Gene location (Human)
Chr.	Chromosome 2 (human)
Band	2q32.2	Start	190,646,746 bp
Band	2q32.2	End	190,692,766 bp

Gene location (Mouse)
Chr.	Chromosome 1 (mouse)
Band	1 C1.1|1 26.99 cM	Start	52,496,453 bp
Band	1 C1.1|1 26.99 cM	End	52,539,838 bp
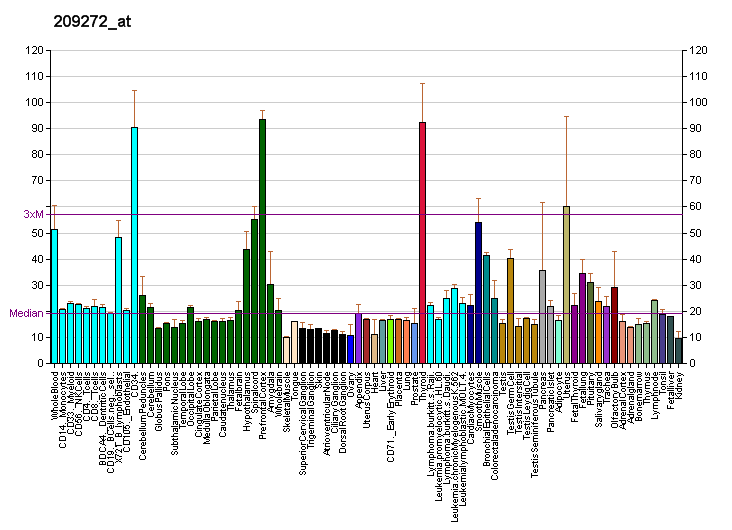

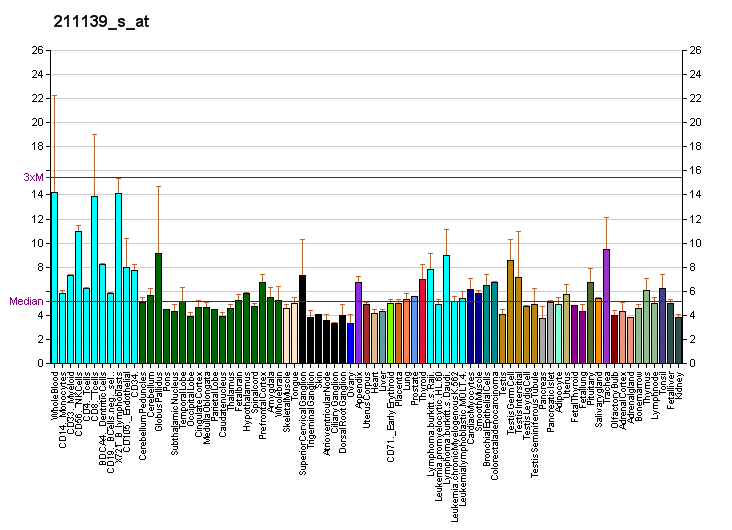

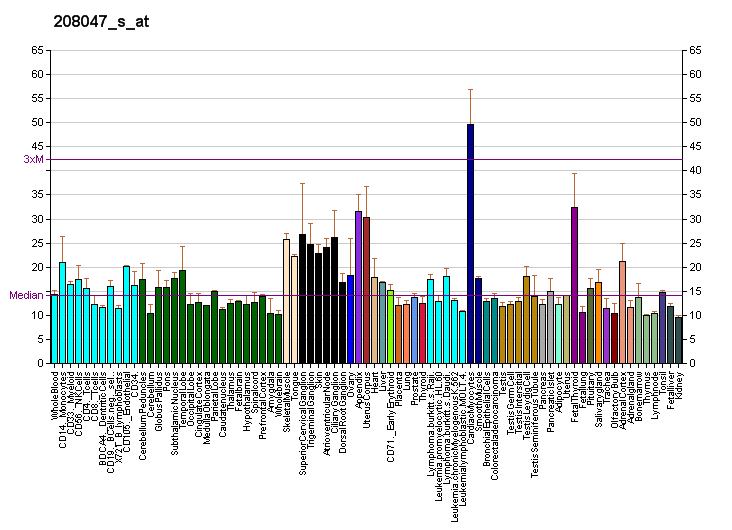
RNA expression pattern
Bgee	Human / Mouse (ortholog); Top expressed in: ganglionic eminence; skin of hip; skin of thigh; Achilles tendon; endothelial cell; Epithelium of choroid plexus; ventricular zone; epithelium of colon; optic nerve; tendon of biceps brachii / Top expressed in: carotid body; saccule; molar; otic placode; conjunctival fornix; calvaria; ascending aorta; skin of external ear; iris; seminal vesicula; More reference expression data
BioGPS	More reference expression data
Gene ontology
Molecular function	transcription factor binding; transcription coregulator activity
Cellular component	nucleus
Biological process	Schwann cell differentiation; myelination; endochondral ossification; regulation of epidermis development; transcription, DNA-templated; negative regulation of transcription, DNA-templated; regulation of transcription, DNA-templated
Sources:Amigo / QuickGO
Orthologs
Species	Human	Mouse
Entrez	4664	17936
Ensembl	ENSG00000138386	ENSMUSG00000002881
UniProt	Q13506	Q61122
RefSeq (mRNA)	NM_005966; NM_001321312; NM_001321313; NM_001321314; NM_001321315	NM_008667
RefSeq (protein)	NP_001308241; NP_001308242; NP_001308243; NP_001308244; NP_005957	NP_032693
Location (UCSC)	Chr 2: 190.65 – 190.69 Mb	Chr 1: 52.5 – 52.54 Mb
PubMed search
- Wikidata
View/Edit Human	View/Edit Mouse

NGFI-A-binding protein 1 is a protein that in humans is encoded by the NAB1 gene.

== Interactions ==
NAB1 has been shown to interact with Zif268.
