= EGR4 =

Protein-coding gene in the species Homo sapiens

Identifiers
- Aliases: EGR4, NGFI-C, NGFIC, PAT133, early growth response 4, Early growth response protein 4, AT133
- External IDs: OMIM: 128992; MGI: 99252; GeneCards: EGR4

Gene location (Human)
Chr.	Chromosome 2 (human)
Band	2p13.2	Start	73,290,929 bp
Band	2p13.2	End	73,293,701 bp

Gene location (Mouse)
Chr.	Chromosome 6 (mouse)
Band	6 C3|6 37.48 cM	Start	85,488,103 bp
Band	6 C3|6 37.48 cM	End	85,490,571 bp
RNA expression pattern
Bgee	Human / Mouse (ortholog); Top expressed in: beta cell; gonad; Region I of hippocampus proper; endothelial cell; testicle; pancreatic ductal cell; putamen; Brodmann area 46; nucleus accumbens; entorhinal cortex / Top expressed in: superior frontal gyrus; primary visual cortex; urethra; female urethra; male urethra; embryo; dentate gyrus of hippocampal formation granule cell; spermatocyte; cerebellar cortex; hippocampus proper; More reference expression data
BioGPS	n/a
Gene ontology
Molecular function	DNA-binding transcription factor activity; DNA binding; metal ion binding; nucleic acid binding; DNA-binding transcription activator activity, RNA polymerase II-specific; sequence-specific DNA binding; DNA-binding transcription factor activity, RNA polymerase II-specific; RNA polymerase II transcription regulatory region sequence-specific DNA binding
Cellular component	nucleus
Biological process	regulation of transcription, DNA-templated; transcription, DNA-templated; positive regulation of cell population proliferation; transcription by RNA polymerase II; positive regulation of transcription by RNA polymerase II; regulation of transcription by RNA polymerase II; cellular response to growth factor stimulus
Sources:Amigo / QuickGO
Orthologs
Databases	NCBI: entry; OMA: entry
Species	Human	Mouse
Entrez	1961	13656
Ensembl	ENSG00000135625	ENSMUSG00000071341
UniProt	Q05215	Q9WUF2
RefSeq (mRNA)	NM_001965	NM_020596
RefSeq (protein)	NP_001956	NP_065621
Location (UCSC)	Chr 2: 73.29 – 73.29 Mb	Chr 6: 85.49 – 85.49 Mb
PubMed search
- Wikidata
View/Edit Human	View/Edit Mouse

Early growth response protein 4 (EGR-4), also known as AT133, is a protein that in humans is encoded by the EGR4 gene.

EGR-4 is a member of the early growth response (EGF) family of zinc finger transcription factors.
