= Effective (database) =

Effective-

Content
- Description: predicted secreted bacterial proteins.
- Organisms: bacteria

Contact
- Research center: Technical University of Munich
- Authors: Marc-André Jehl
- Primary citation: Jehl & al. (2011)
- Release date: 2010

Access
- Website: http://effectors.org

Effective is a database of predicted bacterial secreted proteins.

== See also ==
- Secreted proteins
