= Neurexophilin and PC-esterase domain family member 2 =

Protein-coding gene in the species Homo sapiens

NXPE2

Identifiers
- Aliases: NXPE2, FAM55B, neurexophilin and PC-esterase domain family member 2
- External IDs: MGI: 1925502; HomoloGene: 87072; GeneCards: NXPE2; OMA:NXPE2 - orthologs

Gene location (Human)
Chr.	Chromosome 11 (human)
Band	11q23.2-q23.3	Start	114,678,527 bp
Band	11q23.2-q23.3	End	114,707,069 bp

Gene location (Mouse)
Chr.	Chromosome 9 (mouse)
Band	9|9 A5.3	Start	48,229,306 bp
Band	9|9 A5.3	End	48,264,754 bp
RNA expression pattern
Bgee	Human / Mouse (ortholog); Top expressed in: Achilles tendon; rectum; epithelium of colon; mucosa of transverse colon; salivary gland; smooth muscle tissue; minor salivary glands; appendix; ventricular zone; duodenum / Top expressed in: left colon; spleen; shoulder; human fetus; spinal ganglia; bone marrow; lobe of prostate; muscle of pelvic girdle; liver; urethra; More reference expression data
BioGPS	n/a
Orthologs
Species	Human	Mouse
Entrez	120406	78252
Ensembl	ENSG00000204361	ENSMUSG00000032028
UniProt	Q96DL1	Q3U095
RefSeq (mRNA)	NM_182495	NM_030069
RefSeq (protein)	NP_872301	NP_084345
Location (UCSC)	Chr 11: 114.68 – 114.71 Mb	Chr 9: 48.23 – 48.26 Mb
PubMed search
- Wikidata
View/Edit Human	View/Edit Mouse

Neurexophilin and PC-esterase domain family member 2 is a protein that in humans is encoded by the NXPE2 gene.
