= ZNF268 =

Protein-coding gene in the species Homo sapiens

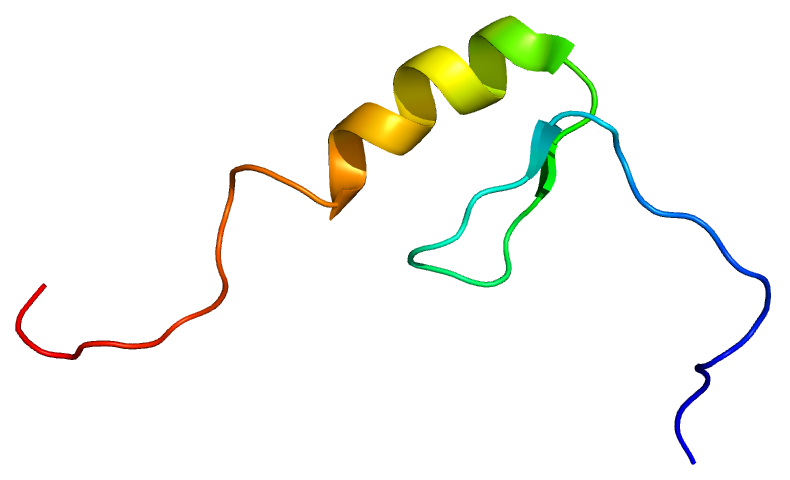

Identifiers
- Aliases: ZNF268, HZF3, zinc finger protein 268
- External IDs: OMIM: 604753; GeneCards: ZNF268
Available structures
PDB	Human UniProt search: PDBe RCSB
PDB	List of PDB id codes 2EL4, 2EL5, 2EL6, 2EM1, 2EMV, 2EMW, 2EMX, 2EMY, 2EN0, 2EN6, 2EN7, 2EOF, 2EOG, 2EOI, 2EOJ, 2EOK, 2EOL, 2EOP, 2EPV, 2EPW, 2EPY, 2YTF, 2YTQ

Gene location (Human)
Chr.	Chromosome 12 (human)
Band	12q24.33	Start	133,181,409 bp
Band	12q24.33	End	133,214,832 bp
RNA expression pattern
Bgee	Human / Mouse (ortholog); Top expressed in: gonad; Epithelium of choroid plexus; Achilles tendon; ventricular zone; ganglionic eminence; buccal mucosa cell; testicle; retinal pigment epithelium; islet of Langerhans; epithelium of colon / n/a; More reference expression data
BioGPS	n/a
Gene ontology
Molecular function	nucleic acid binding; DNA binding; DNA-binding transcription factor activity; metal ion binding; protein binding; DNA-binding transcription factor activity, RNA polymerase II-specific
Cellular component	intracellular anatomical structure; cytoplasm; actin cytoskeleton; nucleus; cytosol
Biological process	regulation of transcription, DNA-templated; cell differentiation; positive regulation of protein phosphorylation; positive regulation of protein catabolic process; regulation of protein heterodimerization activity; positive regulation of cell migration; cellular response to tumor necrosis factor; negative regulation of apoptotic process; negative regulation of transcription by RNA polymerase II; positive regulation of protein homodimerization activity; transcription, DNA-templated; positive regulation of cell differentiation; positive regulation of cell population proliferation; regulation of mitotic cell cycle; positive regulation of apoptotic process; negative regulation of cell population proliferation; positive regulation of transcription by RNA polymerase II; positive regulation of NIK/NF-kappaB signaling
Sources:Amigo / QuickGO
Orthologs
Databases	NCBI: entry; OMA: entry
Species	Human	Mouse
Entrez	10795	n/a
Ensembl	ENSG00000090612	n/a
UniProt	Q14587	n/a
RefSeq (mRNA)	NM_152943; NM_001165881; NM_001165882; NM_001165883; NM_001165884 NM_001165885; NM_001165886; NM_001165887; NM_003415	n/a
RefSeq (protein)	NP_001159353; NP_001159354; NP_001159355; NP_001159356; NP_001159357 NP_001159358; NP_001159359; NP_003406; NP_694422	n/a
Location (UCSC)	Chr 12: 133.18 – 133.21 Mb	n/a
PubMed search		n/a
- Wikidata
View/Edit Human

Zinc finger protein 268 is a protein that, in humans, is encoded by the ZNF268 gene. An alternative name of the protein is HZF3. This protein is 947 amino acids long and has 9 known isoforms. Expression of the protein is observed in the cell nucleus and cytosol. The encoding gene is located on chromosome 12 at band 12q24.33.

== Structure ==
ZNF268 is a KRAB-containing zinc finger protein, and its overall structure reflects the key features that define this large family of proteins.

=== KRAB domain ===
The Kruppel associated box (KRAB) is a domain of roughly 50 to 75 amino acids positioned at the amino-terminus of the protein. This domain is primarily responsible for interactions with other proteins, and it plays a central role in enabling ZNF268 to function as a transcriptional regulator. At present, there are three recognized types of KRAB domains, which arise from different combinations of KRAB box sequences. These proteins may contain the sequence for Box A alone, or for Box A together with either Box B or Box b, producing KRAB A, KRAB A+B, or KRAB A+ b domains. ZNF268 specifically contains a single KRAB A+B domain.

Box A is the region responsible for the actual binding to other proteins. It is longer and more conserved, which supports its essential role in protein–protein interactions. Box B is believed to enhance the binding activity of Box A, although the exact mechanism through which it does so remains unclear. These KRAB domains are typically found in clusters within the genome.

=== Zinc fingers ===
A zinc finger motif is a secondary structural feature that depends on a zinc ion for stability, and this motif is characteristic of proteins in this family. In the ZNF268 protein, two cysteine residues and two histidine residues coordinate a single zinc ion to form one alpha-helix and two beta-sheets. Because more than 700 human proteins and many mammal proteins contain this same basic configuration, it is considered common and is generally referred to as the C2H2-type zinc finger structure. ZNF268 possesses 24 zinc fingers, all located at the C-terminus of the protein. These zinc finger elements allow the protein to bind DNA, double-stranded RNA, or various other proteins.

== Expression and developmental role ==
ZNF268 was first isolated and cloned in 2001 from cDNA derived from a human fetus between three and five weeks of development. This early isolation suggested that ZNF268 might play a developmental role in embryogenesis. A 2004 study using Northern blot analysis compared embryonic and adult tissues and revealed that ZNF268 expression was found exclusively in embryonic tissues, with no detectable expression in adult samples.

In the same study further Northern blot experiments focusing on tissues from a three-month-old embryo indicated that ZNF268 expression was highly tissue-specific, being observed only in the liver. Western blot analysis confirmed this result. Additional antibody-based detection methods showed that ZNF268 was present in the fetal liver as early as five weeks, and its expression persisted through at least four months of development. These findings collectively suggest that ZNF268 may contribute to early liver formation, possibly through regulating genes for hepatic differentiation or maturation.

== Function ==
Members of the KRAB-containing zinc finger protein family are involved in many notable biological functions including cell differentiation, cell proliferation, cell migration, and apoptosis. These processes are essential for shaping tissues, responding to the environment, and maintaining healthy cellular turnover. ZNF268, as a member of this protein family, is believed to share these roles.

From the time of its discovery, ZNF268 has been suspected of functioning as a repressive transcription factor, primarily due to the presence of its KRAB domain. The KRAB domain works by recruiting corepressors, including KAP-1 and members of the HP1 family, which are involved in chromatin remodeling and gene silencing. The combination of a repressive KRAB domain and a large set of zinc fingers, which allow binding to DNA, may permit ZNF268 to act as a versatile regulator capable of influencing numerous cellular pathways.

== Mechanism of action in immune signaling ==
More recent observations have revealed that isoform A of the ZNF268 protein plays a role in interferon signaling, which is a major component of the innate antiviral response. Under normal, uninfected conditions, ZNF268 is present only in very low quantities within the cytoplasm and is continuously broken down by lysosomal degradation. However, upon infection with an RNA or DNA virus, the cellular kinase TBK1 phosphorylates ZNF268 at serine 178. This phosphorylation helps to stabilize the protein, protecting it from degradation and allowing it to accumulate in the cytoplasm.

As its concentration rises, ZNF268 recruits SETD4, which is required for methylating TBK1. This methylation is an important step in assembling the signaling complex responsible for activating IRF3, a transcription factor essential for inducing antiviral genes. Through this pathway, ZNF268 contributes to amplifying the interferon response, thereby helping the cell have a stronger and more effective defense against viral infection.
