= 40S ribosomal protein S14 =

Protein-coding gene in the species Homo sapiens

RPS14

Identifiers
- Aliases: RPS14, EMTB, S14, ribosomal protein S14
- External IDs: OMIM: 130620; MGI: 98107; GeneCards: RPS14
Available structures
PDB	Ortholog search: PDBe RCSB
PDB	List of PDB id codes 4UG0, 4V6X, 5A2Q, 5AJ0, 4KZY, 3J7R, 4D61, 4KZX, 4D5L, 4V5Z, 5FLX, 4UJD, 3J7P, 4KZZ, 4UJE, 4UJC

Gene location (Human)
Chr.	Chromosome 5 (human)
Band	5q33.1	Start	150,442,635 bp
Band	5q33.1	End	150,449,739 bp

Gene location (Mouse)
Chr.	Chromosome 18 (mouse)
Band	18 E1|18 34.4 cM	Start	60,880,170 bp
Band	18 E1|18 34.4 cM	End	60,911,618 bp
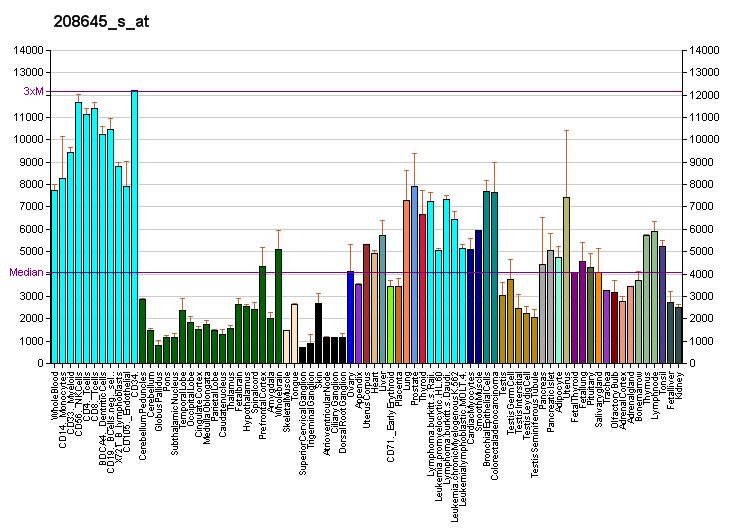
RNA expression pattern
Bgee	Human / Mouse (ortholog); Top expressed in: skin of thigh; caput epididymis; superficial temporal artery; skin of hip; corpus epididymis; mucosa of paranasal sinus; nipple; urethra; human penis; tendon of biceps brachii / Top expressed in: medial ganglionic eminence; efferent ductule; vas deferens; condyle; transitional epithelium of urinary bladder; abdominal wall; fossa; cervix; blastocyst; right lung lobe; More reference expression data
BioGPS	More reference expression data
Gene ontology
Molecular function	small ribosomal subunit rRNA binding; structural constituent of ribosome; translation regulator activity; protein binding; mRNA 5'-UTR binding; RNA binding
Cellular component	cytosol; ribosome; membrane; focal adhesion; cytosolic small ribosomal subunit; nucleolus; mitochondrion; extracellular exosome; extracellular matrix; nucleoplasm; postsynaptic density
Biological process	maturation of SSU-rRNA from tricistronic rRNA transcript (SSU-rRNA, 5.8S rRNA, LSU-rRNA); maturation of SSU-rRNA; viral transcription; negative regulation of transcription by RNA polymerase II; SRP-dependent cotranslational protein targeting to membrane; translational initiation; erythrocyte differentiation; ribosomal small subunit assembly; nuclear-transcribed mRNA catabolic process, nonsense-mediated decay; rRNA processing; protein biosynthesis; regulation of translation
Sources:Amigo / QuickGO
Orthologs
Databases	NCBI: entry; OMA: entry
Species	Human	Mouse
Entrez	6208	20044
Ensembl	ENSG00000164587	ENSMUSG00000024608
UniProt	P62263	P62264
RefSeq (mRNA)	NM_005617; NM_001025070; NM_001025071; NM_005616	NM_020600
RefSeq (protein)	NP_001020241; NP_001020242; NP_005608	NP_065625
Location (UCSC)	Chr 5: 150.44 – 150.45 Mb	Chr 18: 60.88 – 60.91 Mb
PubMed search
- Wikidata
View/Edit Human	View/Edit Mouse

40S ribosomal protein S14 is a protein that in humans is encoded by the RPS14 gene.

Ribosomes, the organelles that catalyze protein synthesis, consist of a small 40S subunit and a large 60S subunit. Together these subunits are composed of 4 RNA species and approximately 80 structurally distinct proteins. This gene encodes a ribosomal protein that is a component of the 40S subunit. The protein belongs to the S11P family of ribosomal proteins. It is located in the cytoplasm. Transcript variants utilizing alternative transcription initiation sites have been described in the literature. As is typical for genes encoding ribosomal proteins, there are multiple processed pseudogenes of this gene dispersed through the genome. In Chinese hamster ovary cells, mutations in this gene can lead to resistance to emetine, a protein synthesis inhibitor.
