= Secretome =

The secretome is the set of proteins expressed by an organism and secreted into the extracellular space. In humans, this subset of the proteome encompasses 13-20% of all proteins, including cytokines, growth factors, extracellular matrix proteins and regulators, and shed receptors. The secretome of a specific tissue can be measured by mass spectrometry and its analysis constitutes a type of proteomics known as secretomics.

== Definition ==
The term secretome was coined by Tjalsma and colleagues in 2004 to denote all the factors secreted by a cell, along with the secretory pathway constituents. In 2010, this definition of secretome was revised to include only proteins secreted into the extracellular space. Related concepts include the matrisome, which is the subset of the secretome that includes extracellular matrix proteins and their associated proteins; the receptome, which includes all membrane receptors, and the adhesome, which includes all proteins involved in cell adhesion.

== Quantification ==
The secreted proteins in humans account for 13–20% of the entire proteome and include growth factors, chemokines, cytokines, adhesion molecules, proteases and shed receptors. Human protein-coding genes (39%, 19613 genes) are predicted to have either a signal peptide and/or at least one transmembrane region suggesting active transport of the corresponding protein out of the cell (secretion) or location in one of the numerous membrane systems in the cell. Increasing evidence showed that, in addition to the protein cargo, non-protein components, such as lipid, micro-RNAs and messenger-RNA, could also be secreted by cells via both microvesicles (100–>1000 nm diameter) − shedding from the plasma membrane − and exosomes (30–150 nm diameter) − released via endosomal-exocytosis event. Factors present in both these organelles accounts for up to 42% of the secretome and have been incorporated as the collective secretome. There is a vast array of methodologies available to study cell secretomes of plant cells, mammalian cells, stem cells and cancer cells.

== See also ==
- Secretomics
- List of omics topics in biology
