= Adhesome =

The term Adhesome was first used by Richard Hynes to describe the complement of cell-cell and cell-matrix adhesion receptors in an organism and later expanded by Benny Geiger and co-workers to include the entire network of structural and signaling proteins involved in regulating cell-matrix adhesion.

== Receptors ==
The major cell-matrix adhesion receptors are integrins and therefore the adhesome of cell-matrix adhesion is referred to as the integrin adhesome. Cell-cell adhesion is primarily mediated by cadherin receptors and therefore the adhesome of cell-cell adhesion is referred to as the cadherin adhesome or cadhesome. The first attempts to establish the set of proteins that participate directly ('bona fide' adhesome components) or affect indirectly ('associated' adhesome components) cell adhesion were based on mining of the primary research literature, and resulted in approximately 200 protein in either integrin or cadherin adhesomes. Later, unbiased proteomic approaches utilizing mass spectrometry have detected hundreds more proteins associated with integrin adhesions. However, a comparison of multiple proteomic studies of the integrin adhesome of fibroblasts attached to fibronectin found only 60 proteins common to all studies.

== Proteins ==
Humphries and co-workers named these 60 proteins the 'consensus integrin adhesome'.

== Investigation ==
Cell-matrix adhesions have been more extensively investigated by proteomics compared with cell-cell adhesions because they are more readily isolated from cells attached to glass. The advent of proximity biotinylation by birA* has facilitated the first proteomics-based studies of the cadherin adhesome.

== Criteria ==
While proteomic methods identified many novel proteins that potentially might be adhesome components they cannot be regarded as adhesome components until they are validated to fulfill the following criteria: 1. they localize to a cell adhesion structure such as focal adhesion or adherens junction. 2. they directly interact with one of the core adhesome components, such as integrin, cadherin or catenins AND/OR their knockdown has a clear effect on cell adhesion.

== Mass spectrometry ==
Mass spectrometry has been successfully used to identify changes in the composition of the adhesome upon perturbation. Schiller et al. as well as Kuo et al. examined the effect of inhibition of myosin contractility on the integrin adhesome composition and found LIM domain proteins and beta-PIX to be tension sensitive. Gou et al. found little change in the cadherin adhesome after calcium depletion from the media, which essentially abrogates cell-cell adhesion. Reinhard Fassler and co-workers used proteomics on specifically engineered cell lines to distinguish between the adhesome of β1- and αv-class integrins.

== Multi domain proteins ==
The adhesome contains multi domain proteins with various functions, some of which are specifically enriched in the adhesome compared to the cell proteome. Protein domains enriched in the adhesome include: Pleckstrin homology (PH) and FERM domains, which target proteins to the plasma membrane; Calponin homology (CH) domain, which is an F-actin binding motif; Src homology 2 (SH2) domain, which mediate interaction with phosphorylated tyrosine residues; armadillo (ARM) GUK and LIM domains, which mediate specific protein-protein binding. The literature-based adhesome contains enzymes, such as protein tyrosine and serine/threonine kinases and phosphatases, guanine nucleotide exchange factors and GTPase activating proteins, E3-ligases and proteases, that regulate adhesion through post translational modification of the many structural and scaffolding proteins found in the adhesome. The proteomic-based studies have identified many proteins from functional groups that haven't previously been associated with cell adhesion sites, such as proteins involved in RNA splicing, translation, trafficking, golgi, endoplasmic reticulum, and metabolic enzymes. Whether these proteins are indeed an integral part of the adhesome or an artifact of the proteomic methods remains to be seen.

== Genomes ==
The availability of genomes of many organisms on the tree of life has opened up the possibility to study how the adhesome evolved from the unicellular relatives of animals through simple animals (e.g. sponges) to mammals. Surprisingly, the majority of cadherin adhesome proteins existed long before multicellularity and had other functions in cells. Later, with the emergence of the cadherin-catenin-actin structure they were co-opted into the cadhesome.
