= H-89 =

Names
- Preferred IUPAC name N-(2-{[(2E)-3-(4-Bromophenyl)prop-2-en-1-yl]amino}ethyl)isoquinoline-5-sulfonamide

Identifiers
CAS Number	127243-85-0
3D model (JSmol)	Interactive image
Abbreviations	H-89; H89
ChEBI	CHEBI:47495
ChEMBL	ChEMBL104264
ChemSpider	395827
DrugBank	DB07995
ECHA InfoCard	100.201.023
EC Number	675-767-3
IUPHAR/BPS	5983
PubChem CID	449241
UNII	M876330O56
CompTox Dashboard (EPA)	DTXSID801022528
- InChI: InChI=1S/C20H20BrN3O2S/c21-18-8-6-16(7-9-18)3-2-11-22-13-14-24-27(25,26)20-5-1-4-17-15-23-12-10-19(17)20/h1-10,12,15,22,24H,11,13-14H2/b3-2+ Key: ZKZXNDJNWUTGDK-NSCUHMNNSA-N; InChI=1/C20H20BrN3O2S/c21-18-8-6-16(7-9-18)3-2-11-22-13-14-24-27(25,26)20-5-1-4-17-15-23-12-10-19(17)20/h1-10,12,15,22,24H,11,13-14H2/b3-2+ Key: ZKZXNDJNWUTGDK-NSCUHMNNBL
- SMILES: c1cc2cnccc2c(c1)S(=O)(=O)NCCNC/C=C/c3ccc(cc3)Br

Properties
Chemical formula	C_{20}H_{20}BrN_{3}O_{2}S
Molar mass	446.36 g·mol^{−1}
Solubility in water	Soluble to 25 mM
Solubility in other solvents	up to 100 mM in DMSO

Hazards
- Occupational safety and health (OHS/OSH)
Main hazards	Exposure may cause irritation to eyes, mucous membranes, upper respiratory tract, and skin.
- GHS labelling
Pictograms	(GHS07: Exclamation mark)
Signal word	Warning
Hazard statements	H302, H312, H315, H319, H332, H335
- Except where otherwise noted, data are given for materials in their standard state (at 25 °C [77 °F], 100 kPa). verify (what is ?) Infobox references

H-89 is a protein kinase inhibitor with greatest effect on protein kinase A (PKA). H-89, derived from H-8 (N-[2-(methylamino)ethyl]-5-isoquinoline-sulfonamide), was initially believed to act specifically as an inhibitor of PKA, being 30 times more potent than H-8 at inhibiting PKA and 10 times less potent at inhibiting protein kinase G. It achieves this through competitive inhibition of the adenosine triphosphate (ATP) site on the PKA catalytic subunit. However, subsequent work has suggested a variety of additional effects such as inhibition of other protein kinases (IC_{50} values of 80, 120, 135, 270, 2600 and 2800 nM for S6K1, MSK1, PKA, ROCKII, PKBα and MAPKAP-K1b respectively), and direct inhibition of various potassium currents.

In addition to its use in studying mechanisms of cell signalling, H-89 has also been used experimentally in vivo. H-89 has been shown to increase the threshold and latency of pentylenetetrazol-induced seizures and decrease morphine withdrawal symptoms in mice.
