= EGR3 =

Protein-coding gene in humans

Identifiers
- Aliases: EGR3, EGR-3, PILOT, early growth response 3
- External IDs: OMIM: 602419; MGI: 1306780; GeneCards: EGR3

Gene location (Human)
| Chr. | Chromosome 8 (human) |
| Band | 8p21.3 | Start | 22,687,659 bp |
| Band | 8p21.3 | End | 22,693,480 bp |

Gene location (Mouse)
| Chr. | Chromosome 14 (mouse) |
| Band | 14|14 D2 | Start | 70,314,652 bp |
| Band | 14|14 D2 | End | 70,320,063 bp |
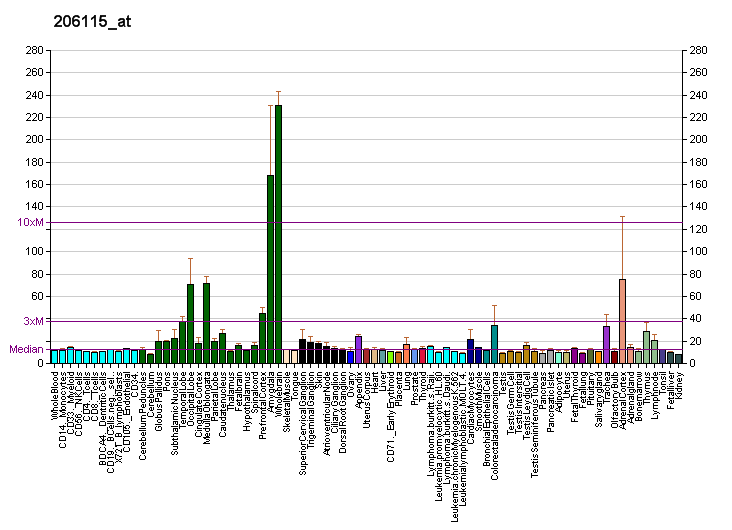
RNA expression pattern
| Bgee | Human / Mouse (ortholog); Top expressed in: skin of thigh; parietal pleura; gastric mucosa; mucosa of paranasal sinus; lactiferous duct; skin of arm; sural nerve; orbitofrontal cortex; frontal pole; periodontal fiber / Top expressed in: prefrontal cortex; hair follicle; primary motor cortex; skin of abdomen; olfactory tubercle; skin of external ear; cingulate gyrus; nucleus accumbens; piriform cortex; temporal lobe; More reference expression data |
| BioGPS | More reference expression data |
Gene ontology
| Molecular function | DNA-binding transcription factor activity; metal ion binding; DNA binding; nucleic acid binding; DNA-binding transcription factor activity, RNA polymerase II-specific; sequence-specific DNA binding; RNA polymerase II transcription regulatory region sequence-specific DNA binding |
| Cellular component | nucleus |
| Biological process | circadian rhythm; endothelial cell chemotaxis; cell migration involved in sprouting angiogenesis; muscle organ development; regulation of transcription, DNA-templated; positive regulation of endothelial cell proliferation; cellular response to fibroblast growth factor stimulus; negative regulation of apoptotic process; cellular response to vascular endothelial growth factor stimulus; transcription, DNA-templated; neuromuscular synaptic transmission; peripheral nervous system development; positive regulation of T cell differentiation in thymus; regulation of gamma-delta T cell differentiation; positive regulation of transcription by RNA polymerase II; regulation of transcription by RNA polymerase II; cellular response to growth factor stimulus |
Sources:Amigo / QuickGO
Orthologs
| Databases | NCBI: entry; OMA: entry |
| Species | Human | Mouse |
| Entrez | 1960 | 13655 |
| Ensembl | ENSG00000179388 | ENSMUSG00000033730 |
| UniProt | Q06889 | P43300 |
| RefSeq (mRNA) | NM_001199880; NM_001199881; NM_004430 | NM_001289925; NM_001289927; NM_018781 |
| RefSeq (protein) | NP_001186809; NP_001186810; NP_004421 | NP_001276854; NP_001276856; NP_061251 |
| Location (UCSC) | Chr 8: 22.69 – 22.69 Mb | Chr 14: 70.31 – 70.32 Mb |
| PubMed search |
- Wikidata
| View/Edit Human | View/Edit Mouse |

Early growth response protein 3 is a protein in humans, encoded by the EGR3 gene.

The gene encodes a transcriptional regulator that belongs to the EGR family of C2H2-type zinc-finger proteins. It is an immediate-early growth response gene which is induced by mitogenic stimulation. The protein encoded by this gene participates in the transcriptional regulation of genes in controlling biological rhythm. It may also play a role in muscle development.
