= Mir-145 =

Non-coding RNA in the species Homo sapiens

MIR145

Identifiers
- Aliases: MIR145, microRNA 145, MIRN145, miR-145, miRNA145, MIRN145 microRNA, human
- External IDs: OMIM: 611795; GeneCards: MIR145; OMA:MIR145 - orthologs

Gene location (Human)
| Chr. | Chromosome 5 (human) |
| Band | 5q32 | Start | 149,430,646 bp |
| Band | 5q32 | End | 149,430,733 bp |
RNA expression pattern
| Bgee | Human / Mouse (ortholog); Top expressed in: right coronary artery; gastric mucosa; smooth muscle tissue; left uterine tube; tibial arteries; muscle layer of sigmoid colon; body of uterus; myometrium; left coronary artery; prostate / n/a; More reference expression data |
| BioGPS | n/a |
Orthologs
| Species | Human | Mouse |
| Entrez | 406937 | n/a |
| Ensembl | ENSG00000276365 | n/a |
| UniProt | n a | n/a |
| RefSeq (mRNA) | n/a | n/a |
| RefSeq (protein) | n/a | n/a |
| Location (UCSC) | Chr 5: 149.43 – 149.43 Mb | n/a |
| PubMed search | | n/a |
- Wikidata
| View/Edit Human |

mir-145
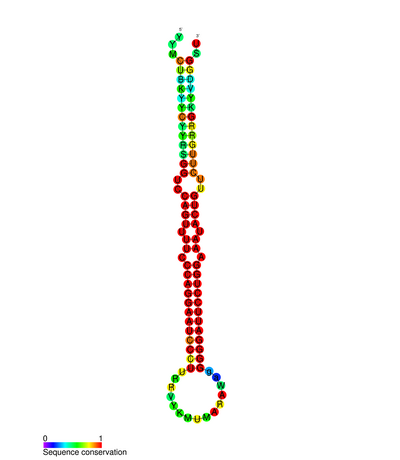
- Conserved secondary structure of mir-145

Identifiers
- Symbol: mir-145
- Rfam: RF00675
- miRBase family: MIPF0000079

Other data
- RNA type: microRNA
- Domain: Eukaryota;
- PDB structures: PDBe

In molecular biology, mir-145 microRNA is a short RNA molecule that in humans is encoded by the MIR145 gene. MicroRNAs function to regulate the expression levels of other genes by several mechanisms.

== Targets ==
MicroRNAs are involved in down-regulation of a variety of target genes. Götte et al. have shown that experimental over-expression of mir-145 down-regulates the junctional cell adhesion molecule JAM-A as well as the actin bundling protein fascin in breast cancer and endometriosis cells, resulting in a reduction of cell motility. Larsson et al. showed that miR-145 targets the 3' UTR of the FLI1 gene, a finding that was later supported by Zhang et al.

== Role in cancer ==
miR-145 is hypothesised to be a tumor suppressor. miR-145 has been shown to be down-regulated in breast cancer. miR-145 is also involved in colon cancer and acute myeloid leukemia.
