= Secretory protein =

A process by which molecules are produced and released from a cell, gland or organ.

A secretory protein is any protein, whether it be endocrine or exocrine, which is secreted by a cell. Secretory proteins include many hormones, enzymes, toxins, and antimicrobial peptides. Secretory proteins are synthesized in the endoplasmic reticulum.

== Production ==
The production of a secretory protein starts like any other protein. The mRNA is produced and transported to the cytosol where it interacts with a free cytosolic ribosome. The part that is produced first, the N-terminal, contains a signal sequence consisting of 6 to 12 amino acids with hydrophobic side chains. This sequence is recognised by a cytosolic ribonucleoprotein, SRP (Signal Recognition Particle), which stops the translation and aids in the transport of the mRNA-ribosome complex to an SRP receptor found in the membrane of the endoplasmic reticulum. When it arrives at the ER, the signal sequence is transferred to the translocon, a protein-conducting channel in the membrane that allows the newly synthesized polypeptide to be translocated to the ER lumen. The dissociation of SRP from the ribosome restores the translation of the secretory protein. The signal sequence is removed and the translation continues while the produced chain moves through the translocon (cotranslational translocation).

== Modification ==
After the production of the protein is completed, it interacts with several other proteins to gain its final state.

=== Endoplasmic reticulum ===
After translation, proteins within the ER make sure that the protein is folded correctly. If after a first attempt the folding is unsuccessful, a second folding is attempted. If this fails too the protein is exported to the cytosol and labelled for destruction. Aside from the folding, there is also a sugar chain added to the protein. After these changes, the protein is transported to the Golgi apparatus by a coated vesicle using coating protein COPII.

=== Golgi apparatus ===
In the Golgi apparatus, the sugar chains are modified by adding or removing certain sugars. The secretory protein leaves the Golgi apparatus by an uncoated vesicle.

== Secretion ==
Membrane proteins with functional areas on the cytosolic side of both the vesicle and cell membrane make sure the vesicle associates with the membrane. The vesicle membrane fuses with the cell membrane and so the protein leaves the cell. Some vesicles don't fuse immediately and await a signal before starting the fusing. This is seen in vesicles carrying neurotransmitter in presynaptic cells. This process constitutes an effective cell-cell signaling mechanism via membrane vesicle trafficking from secretory cell to the target cells in human or animal body.

The process has been extended to the host–pathogen interface, wherein, gram negative bacteria secrete outer membrane vesicles containing fully conformed signal proteins and virulence factors via exocytosis of nano-sized vesicles, in order to control host or target cell activities and exploit their environment.

== Sequence data and related databases ==
- Effective, database (2010)
- UniProt contains manually curated secretory proteins. There are also computationally predicted secretory protein databases, these databases are listed in the secretome section.

== See also ==
- Bacterial outer membrane vesicles
- Exocytosis
- Host–pathogen interaction
- Membrane vesicle trafficking
- Secretion
- Secretome
- Secretomics
