= EGR1 =

Protein-coding gene in the species Homo sapiens

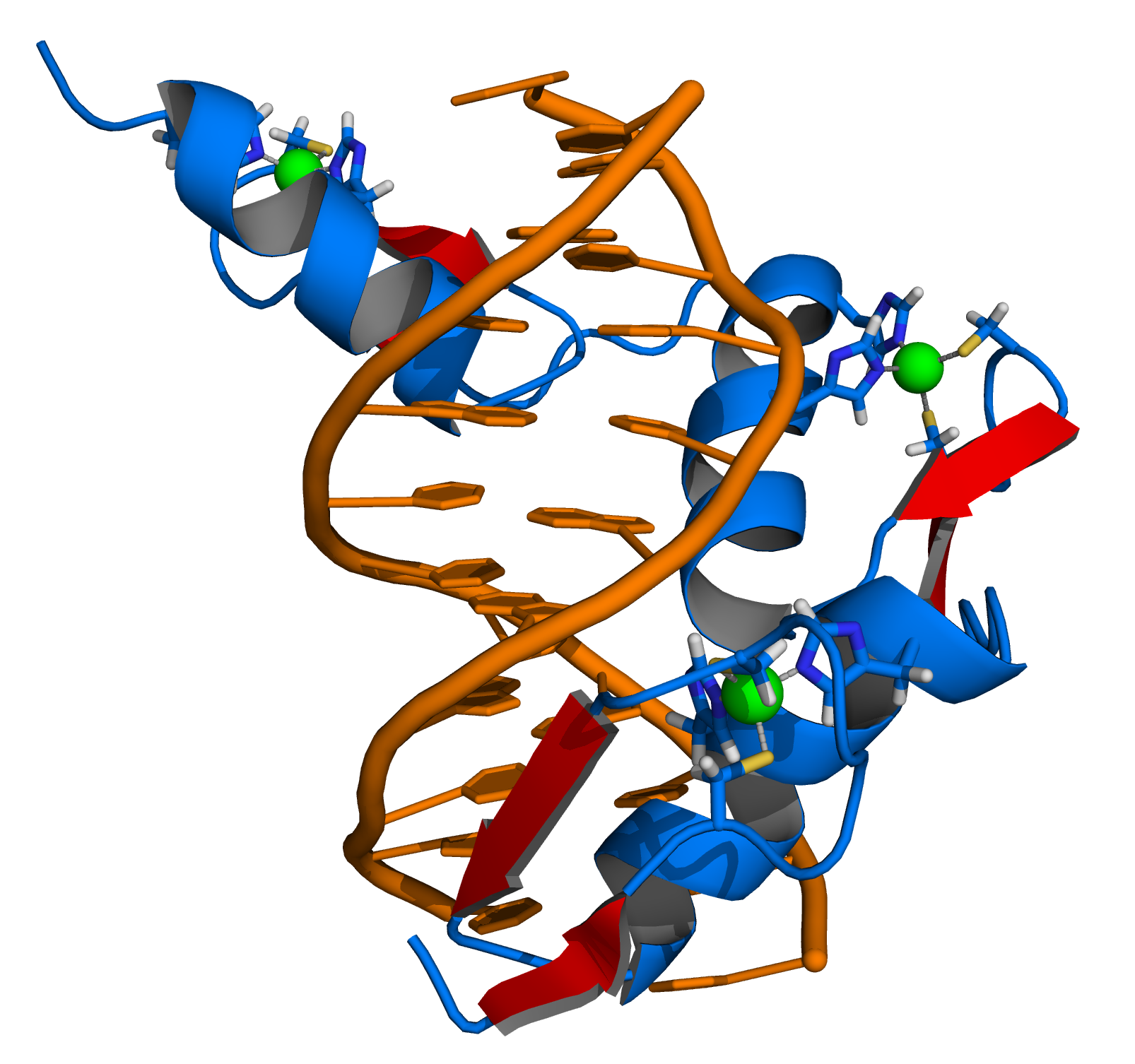

Identifiers
- Aliases: EGR1, AT225, G0S30, KROX-24, NGFI-A, TIS8, ZIF-268, ZNF225, early growth response 1
- External IDs: OMIM: 128990; MGI: 95295; GeneCards: EGR1
Available structures
PDB	Ortholog search: PDBe RCSB
PDB	List of PDB id codes 4R2A, 4R2C, 4R2D, 4X9J

Gene location (Human)
Chr.	Chromosome 5 (human)
Band	5q31.2	Start	138,465,479 bp
Band	5q31.2	End	138,469,303 bp

Gene location (Mouse)
Chr.	Chromosome 18 (mouse)
Band	18 B1|18 18.76 cM	Start	34,992,876 bp
Band	18 B1|18 18.76 cM	End	34,998,037 bp
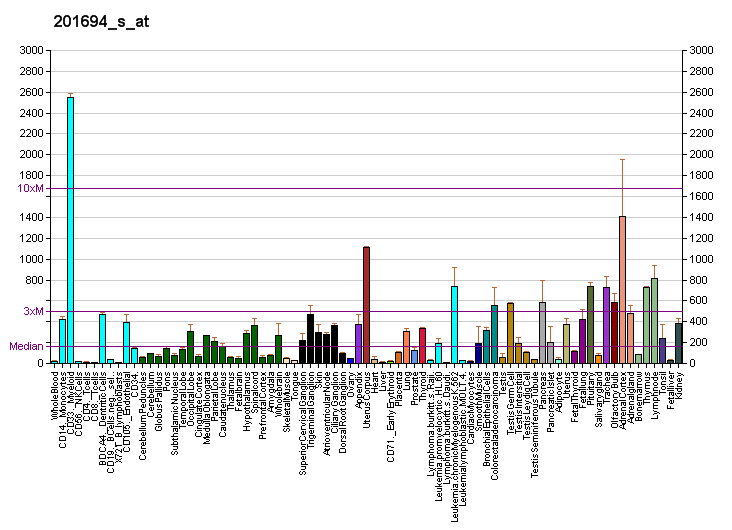

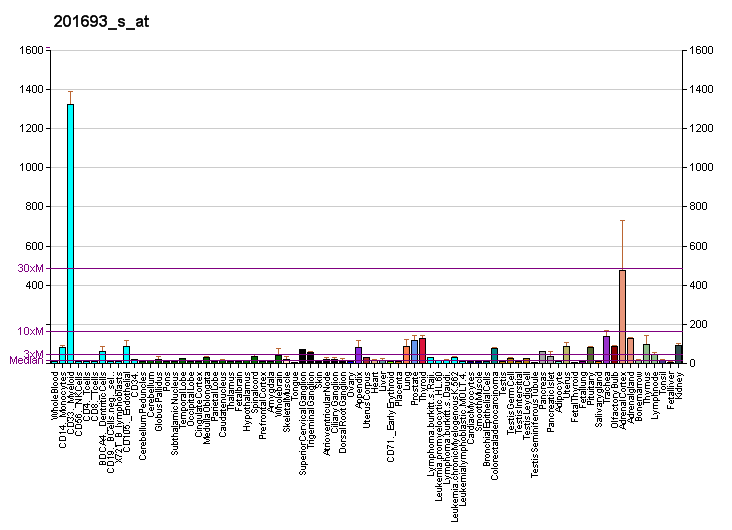
RNA expression pattern
Bgee	Human / Mouse (ortholog); Top expressed in: gastric mucosa; left uterine tube; gallbladder; saphenous vein; vena cava; skin of thigh; nipple; periodontal fiber; seminal vesicula; renal medulla / Top expressed in: granulocyte; prefrontal cortex; dorsal striatum; cingulate gyrus; primary motor cortex; visual cortex; cumulus cell; nucleus accumbens; primary visual cortex; superior frontal gyrus; More reference expression data
BioGPS	More reference expression data
Gene ontology
Molecular function	DNA binding; sequence-specific DNA binding; RNA polymerase II transcription regulatory region sequence-specific DNA binding; DNA-binding transcription factor activity; DNA-binding transcription activator activity, RNA polymerase II-specific; transcription cis-regulatory region binding; metal ion binding; transcription factor activity, RNA polymerase II core promoter proximal region sequence-specific binding; protein binding; histone acetyltransferase binding; nucleic acid binding; hemi-methylated DNA-binding; double-stranded methylated DNA binding; zinc ion binding; promoter-specific chromatin binding; DNA-binding transcription factor activity, RNA polymerase II-specific
Cellular component	nucleoplasm; nucleus; cytoplasm
Biological process	regulation of apoptotic process; cellular response to organic substance; regulation of transcription, DNA-templated; glomerular mesangial cell proliferation; negative regulation of transcription by RNA polymerase II; response to glucose; transcription by RNA polymerase II; BMP signaling pathway; transcription, DNA-templated; positive regulation of transcription, DNA-templated; response to insulin; interleukin-1-mediated signaling pathway; cellular response to mycophenolic acid; T cell differentiation; type I interferon signaling pathway; positive regulation of glomerular metanephric mesangial cell proliferation; cellular response to gamma radiation; regulation of transcription from RNA polymerase II promoter in response to hypoxia; skeletal muscle cell differentiation; cellular response to heparin; regulation of protein sumoylation; negative regulation of canonical Wnt signaling pathway; positive regulation of transcription by RNA polymerase II; cellular response to interleukin-8; response to hypoxia; response to ischemia; estrous cycle; positive regulation of hormone biosynthetic process; regulation of progesterone biosynthetic process; regulation of transcription by RNA polymerase II; positive regulation of gene expression; circadian regulation of gene expression; locomotor rhythm; rhythmic process; circadian temperature homeostasis; positive regulation of neuron death; positive regulation of tau-protein kinase activity
Sources:Amigo / QuickGO
Orthologs
Databases	NCBI: entry; OMA: entry
Species	Human	Mouse
Entrez	1958	13653
Ensembl	ENSG00000120738	ENSMUSG00000038418
UniProt	P18146	P08046
RefSeq (mRNA)	NM_001964	NM_007913
RefSeq (protein)	NP_001955	NP_031939
Location (UCSC)	Chr 5: 138.47 – 138.47 Mb	Chr 18: 34.99 – 35 Mb
PubMed search
- Wikidata
View/Edit Human	View/Edit Mouse

EGR-1 (Early growth response protein 1) or NGFI-A (nerve growth factor-induced protein A) is a protein that in humans is encoded by the EGR1 gene.

EGR-1 is a mammalian transcription factor. It was also named Krox-24, TIS8, and ZENK. It was originally discovered in mice.

== Function ==
The protein encoded by this gene belongs to the EGR family of Cys_{2}His_{2}-type zinc finger proteins. It is a nuclear protein and functions as a transcriptional regulator. The products of target genes it activates are required for differentiation and mitogenesis. Studies suggest this is a tumor suppressor gene.

It has a distinct pattern of expression in the brain, and its induction has been shown to be associated with neuronal activity. Several studies suggest it has a role in neuronal plasticity.

EGR-1 is an important transcription factor in memory formation. It has an essential role in brain neuron epigenetic reprogramming. EGR-1 recruits the TET1 protein that initiates a pathway of DNA demethylation. Removing DNA methylation marks allows the activation of downstream genes. EGR-1, together with TET1, is employed in programming the distribution of methylation sites on brain DNA during brain development, in learning and in long-term neuronal plasticity. EGR-1 has also been found to regulate the expression of VAMP2 (a protein important for synaptic exocytosis).

Beside its function in the nervous system, there is significant evidence that EGR-1 along with its paralog EGR-2 is induced in fibrotic diseases has key functions in fibrinogenesis and is necessary for experimentally induced fibrosis in mice.

It may also be involved in ovarian function

== Structure ==
The DNA-binding domain of EGR-1 consists of three zinc finger domains of the Cys_{2}His_{2} type. The amino acid structure of the EGR-1 zinc finger domain is given in this table, using the single letter amino acid code. The fingers 1 to 3 are indicated by f1 - f3. The numbers are in reference to the residues (amino acids) of alpha helix (there is no zero). The residues marked 'x' are not part of the zinc fingers, but rather serve to connect them all together.

																				-1	1	2	3	4	5	6	7	8	9			x	x	x	x	x
f1	M	A	E	E	R	P	Y	A	C	P	V	E	S	C	D	R	R	F	S	R	S	D	E	L	T	R	H	I	R	I	H	T	G	Q	K	P
f2							F	Q	C	R	I	-	-	C	M	R	N	F	S	R	S	D	H	L	T	T	H	I	R	T	H	T	G	E	K	P
f3							F	A	C	D	I	-	-	C	G	R	K	F	A	R	S	D	E	R	K	R	H	T	K	I	H	L	R	Q	K	D

Amino acid key: Alanine (Ala, A), Arginine (Arg, R), Asparagine (Asn, N), Aspartic acid (Asp, D), Cysteine (Cys, C), Glutamic acid (Glu, E), Glutamine (Gln, Q), Glycine (Gly, G), Histidine (His, H), Isoleucine (Ile, I), Leucine (Leu, L), Lysine (Lys, K), Methionine (Met, M), Phenylalanine (Phe, F), Proline (Pro, P), Serine (Ser, S), Threonine (Thr, T), Tryptophan (Trp, W), Tyrosine (Tyr, Y), Valine (Val, V)

The crystal structure of DNA bound by the zinc finger domain of EGR-1 was solved in 1991, which greatly aided early research in zinc finger DNA-binding domains.

The human EGR-1 protein contains (in its unprocessed form) 543 amino acids with a molecular weight of 57.5 kDa, and the gene is located on the chromosome 5.

== DNA binding specificity ==
EGR-1 binds the DNA sequence 5'-GCG TGG GCG-3' (and similar ones like 5'-GCG GGG GCG-3'). The f1 position 6 binds the 5' G (the first base count from the left); the f1 position 3 to the second base (C); f1 position -1 binds to the third position (G); f2 position 6 to the fourth base (T); and so on.

== Interactions ==
EGR-1 has been shown to interact with:

- CEBPB,
- CREB-binding protein,
- EP300,
- NAB1,
- P53, and
- PSMA3

== See also ==
- Zinc finger
