= CIMIP6 =

Protein-coding gene in humans

Identifiers
- Aliases: CIMIP6, chromosome 2 open reading frame 73, C2orf73, Ciliary Microtubule Inner Protein 6
- External IDs: MGI: 1922337; GeneCards: CIMIP6

Gene location (Human)
Chr.	Chromosome 2 (human)
Band	2p16.2	Start	54,330,034 bp
Band	2p16.2	End	54,383,742 bp

Gene location (Mouse)
Chr.	Chromosome 11 (mouse)
Band	11|11 A4	Start	30,376,006 bp
Band	11|11 A4	End	30,421,827 bp
RNA expression pattern
Bgee	Human / Mouse (ortholog); Top expressed in: left testis; right testis; right uterine tube; buccal mucosa cell; sperm; bronchial epithelial cell; testicle; olfactory zone of nasal mucosa; mucosa of paranasal sinus; islet of Langerhans / Top expressed in: seminiferous tubule; spermatid; embryo; spermatocyte; zygote; secondary oocyte; proximal tubule; right kidney; olfactory epithelium; islet of Langerhans; More reference expression data
BioGPS	n/a
Orthologs
Databases	NCBI: entry; OMA: entry
Species	Human	Mouse
Entrez	129852	75087
Ensembl	ENSG00000177994	ENSMUSG00000040919
UniProt	Q8N5S3	Q5SPV6
RefSeq (mRNA)	NM_001100396; NM_173486; NM_001369401; NM_001369403	NM_001100394
RefSeq (protein)	NP_001093866; NP_001356330; NP_001356332	NP_001093864
Location (UCSC)	Chr 2: 54.33 – 54.38 Mb	Chr 11: 30.38 – 30.42 Mb
PubMed search
- Wikidata
View/Edit Human	View/Edit Mouse

Ciliary microtubule inner protein 6 (CMIP6) is a protein that in humans is encoded by the CIMIP6 gene (previously C2or73). The protein CMIP6 is predicted to be localized to the cilium.

== Gene ==
The full gene spans a total of 53,712 base pairs and contains nine exons. The gene's location in the Human genome is on chromosome 2 at position 2p16.2 and is flanked by the genes ACYP2 and SPTBN1.

== mRNA ==
The primary mRNA produced by the C2or73 gene is 1921 nucleotides long. There are six other mRNA isoforms produced by alternative splicing and variation in exon length.

Isoform	Exons	mRNA Length (bases)
Primary	2, 3, 5, 6, 7	1921
X1	2, 3, 5, 6, 7 (truncated), 8, 9	1726
X2	2, 3 (truncated), 5, 6, 7 (truncated)	971
X3	2 (truncated), 5, 6, 7 (truncated)	868
X4	4, 5, 6, 7 (truncated)	951
X5	1, 5, 6, 7 (truncated)	1049
X6	2, 3, 5, 7 (truncated)	1034

== Protein ==
The protein has a molecular mass of 32,142 daltons. There are four protein isoforms. The primary isoform (X1) is 287 amino acids long.

C2orf73 contains a short sequence motif, GDWWSH (This motif does not yet have any known function). The protein is lysine rich and leucine poor compared to the content of the average Human gene and has a predicted isoelectric point of 9.305.

Isoform	From mRNA Isoform	Length (Amino Acids)	Molecular Weight (kDa)	Isoelectric Point
X1	Primary, X1	287	32.1	9.305
X2	X2	229	25.4	9.120
X3	X3, X4, X5	166	18.1	9.703
X4	X6	143	16.7	8.790

== Structure ==
A 3D structure for C2orf73 has not yet been determined experimentally. A computational prediction made by I-TASSER is presented in Figure 1.

Figure 1. Predicted 3D structure of Human C2orf73 protein generated by I-TASSER

The PELE tool on Biology Workbench predicts three likely α-helices and one β-strand in the protein.

== Post translational modifications ==
The GPS, NetPhos, MyHits and SUMOsp tools on ExPASy predict potential post-translational modifications for the protein. Six potential phosphorylation sites and one sumoylation site are predicted.

== Subcellular localization ==
PSORT II predicts C2orf73 to be localized to the nucleus. This is supported by the predicted presence of a sumoylation site, which is involved in nuclear cytoplasmic transport.

== Expression ==
GEO profiles from NCBI show that C2orf73 is weakly expressed in the following tissues in Humans: bone marrow, liver, heart, lung, brain, spinal cord, skeletal muscle, thymus, and epithelium.

== Regulation of expression ==
The Genomatix El Dorado tool predicts many transcription factors to have a high binding affinity in the 1100 base pairs upstream of C2orf73. Many of the transcription factors normally regulate processes such as cell development and differentiation, cell death, and the cell cycle.

== Interacting proteins ==
Three proteins have been experimentally determined to interact with C2orf73 through Yeast Two-Hybrid experiments.

- FCH and Double SH3 Domains 2 (FCHSD2) – Function has not yet been defined
- Heat Shock Protein Family B Member 1 (HSPB1) – Aids cell's resistance to stress
- SH3 Domain Binding Protein 4 (SH3BP4) – Involved in endocytosis of specific cell surface receptors

== Function ==
The function of C2orf73 is currently not well understood by the scientific community or anyone else.

== Homology ==
There are no paralogs of C2orf73 in the Human genome. Orthologs are found throughout, but are limited to, the phylum Chordata (with a few exceptions in other phyla of the kingdom Animalia, like the Octopus bimaculoides).

Species	Common name	NCBI Accession Number	Sequence length (AA)	Millions of Years Since LCA	% Identity	% Similarity
Homo sapiens	Human	NP_001093866.1	287	-	-	-
Heterocephalus glaber	Naked mole rat	XP_004867342.1	235	90	62.2	68.2
Mus musculus	Mouse	NP_001093864.1	233	90	54.9	62.8
Fukomys damarensis	Damaraland mole-rat	XP_010614136.2	288	90	75.0	83.7
Pteropus vampyrus	Large Flying Fox	XP_011362281.1	291	96	77.7	82.8
Eptesicus fuscus	Big Brown Bat	XP_008160678.1	321	96	61.8	67.6
Rhinolophus sinicus	Chinese Rufous Horseshoe Bat	XP_019575083.1	301	96	71.4	79.4
Erinaceus europaeus	European Hedgehog	XP_007528011.1	284	96	63.8	71.4
Condylura cristata	Star nosed mole	XP_012586937.1	291	96	69.8	79.0
Camelus ferus	Wild Bactrian camel	XP_006174505.1	291	96	75.6	83.2
Capra hircus	Goat	XP_013823176.1	285	96	73.1	77.9
Bos taurus	Cattle	NP_001094753.1	290	96	75.5	81.0
Panthera pardus	Leopard	XP_019277335.1	292	96	75.0	82.2
Ursus maritimus	Polar Bear	XP_008698084.1	290	96	77.3	84.5
Falco peregrinus	Peregrine Falcon	XP_013152712.1	231	312	36.2	44.6
Apteryx mantelli	North Island Brown Kiwi	XP_013805202.1	197	312	36.9	41.9
Python bivittatus	Burmese Python	XP_007425859.1	314	312	30.8	45.0
Anolis carolinensis	Carolina anole	XP_003216202.2	320	312	35.3	42.7
Xenopus laevis	African Clawed Frog	XP_018118010.1	307	352	36.9	52.2
Nanorana parkeri	Frog	XP_018419829.1	307	352	36.4	45.8
Callorhinchus milii	Australian Ghostshark	XP_007890694.1	293	473	28.0	34.9
Ciona intestinalis	Sea squirt	XP_002125895.1	235	676	22.4	34.5
Octopus bimaculoides	California two-spot octopus	XP_014784430.1	242	797	22.4	30.0
Saccoglossus kowalevskii	Acorn Worm	XP_002735239.2	232	684	17.9	27.9
