= Neurotrypsin =

Enzyme found in humans

PRSS12

Identifiers
- Aliases: PRSS12, BSSP-3, BSSP3, MRT1, protease, serine 12, serine protease 12, motopsin, leydin
- External IDs: OMIM: 606709; MGI: 1100881; GeneCards: PRSS12

Gene location (Human)
Chr.	Chromosome 4 (human)
Band	4q26	Start	118,280,038 bp
Band	4q26	End	118,353,003 bp

Gene location (Mouse)
Chr.	Chromosome 3 (mouse)
Band	3|3 G1	Start	123,240,562 bp
Band	3|3 G1	End	123,300,246 bp
RNA expression pattern
Bgee	Human / Mouse (ortholog); Top expressed in: bronchial epithelial cell; stromal cell of endometrium; olfactory zone of nasal mucosa; right uterine tube; mucosa of paranasal sinus; gonad; gallbladder; epithelium of nasopharynx; vulva; nasal epithelium / Top expressed in: sciatic nerve; morula; trigeminal ganglion; facial motor nucleus; fossa; cartilage tissue; ankle joint; primary oocyte; prefrontal cortex; motor neuron; More reference expression data
BioGPS	n/a
Gene ontology
Molecular function	scavenger receptor activity; peptidase activity; serine-type peptidase activity; serine-type endopeptidase activity; hydrolase activity
Cellular component	extracellular region; axon; terminal bouton; plasma membrane; dendrite; synapse; synaptic cleft; cytoplasmic vesicle; membrane
Biological process	zymogen activation; receptor-mediated endocytosis; proteolysis; exocytosis; endocytosis
Sources:Amigo / QuickGO
Orthologs
Databases	NCBI: entry; OMA: entry
Species	Human	Mouse
Entrez	8492	19142
Ensembl	ENSG00000164099	ENSMUSG00000027978
UniProt	P56730	O08762
RefSeq (mRNA)	NM_003619	NM_008939
RefSeq (protein)	NP_003610	NP_032965
Location (UCSC)	Chr 4: 118.28 – 118.35 Mb	Chr 3: 123.24 – 123.3 Mb
PubMed search
- Wikidata
View/Edit Human	View/Edit Mouse

Neurotrypsin, also called motopsin, is an enzyme that in humans is encoded by the gene PRSS12 (protease, serine 12). This enzyme specifically cleaves the protein agrin, and is particularly important during brain development.

== Function ==
Neurotrypsin is activated by NMDA receptors, leading to the cleavage of agrin in the neural synapses. The cleaved agrin subsequently binds to and inhibits the α3 subunit of the sodium-potassium pump, which causes more frequent neuron firing. In the hippocampus, the cleaving of agrin appears to be important for the formation of dendritic filopodia.

== Medical Significance ==
Pathogenic mutations in PRSS12 are associated with moderate to severe intellectual disability. This form of disability is called autosomal recessive intellectual developmental disorder-1, and denoted MRT1 (based on a previous historical name).
