= Edward George Gray =

British anatomist and neuroscientist

Edward George Gray FRS
- Born: 11 January 1924; Pontypool, Monmouthshire, UK
- Died: 14 August 1999 (aged 75); Welwyn Garden City, Hertfordshire, UK
- Education: Aberystwyth University
- Known for: Electron microscopy of synapses
- Spouse: May Rautiainen (m. 1953)
- Children: 2 sons, Tim and Peter
- Parents: William Gray (father); Charlotte Atkinson (mother)
- Scientific career
- Fields: Neuroanatomy
- Workplaces: University College London
- Doctoral advisors: E.G. Healey, J.Z. Young

Signature
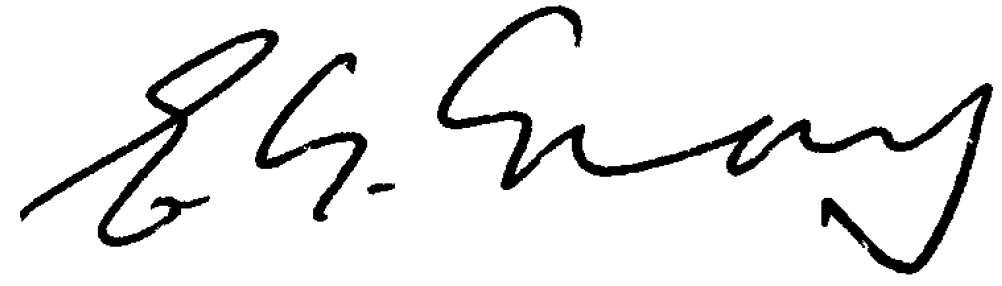

Edward George Gray (1924–1999) was a British anatomist and neuroscientist who pioneered the investigation of neural tissues with transmission electron microscopy. During his professional career, Gray made a number of profound contributions to our knowledge of synaptic structure. To this day, chemical synapses are classified according to their ultrastructure as Gray type 1 (asymmetric) or type 2 (symmetric), corresponding to excitatory and inhibitory synapses, respectively.

== Early life and education ==
Gray's grandparents moved to the United States, and his father, William Gray was born in Alabama in 1893, but the family returned to Wales at the end of 19th century. Edward George's parents, William Gray and Charlotte Atkinson, met in Belfast while William served there in British military. The couple later married and had 5 children, E. George being the eldest, born in Pontypool on 11 January 1924. The family moved to Abergavenny around 1932. In his childhood, George Gray acquired interest in natural history and science, which was stimulated by his father and grandfather from whom he got a small microsope and many books. One of his primary school teachers introduced him to study of electricity and radio, and George learned Morse code by himself. Also at school he gained access to better microscopes, and his interest in biology continued. He also sang in a school choir and learned musical composition, as well as painting, using water colours. George's further education was hampered because the family could not afford a university tuition. As a young man, he worked as a bank clerk. During World War II, E. George Gray served in the Royal Navy in the rank of Able Seaman on a destroyer. After the war, a military grant enabled him to resume his education, and Gray studied zoology, marine biology and helminthology at the University College of Wales in Aberystwyth, where he obtained his BSc degree in 1952. Gray studied for his PhD in Aberystwyth, investigating the effects of denervation of melanophores in minnows. During that time, George met May Eine Rautianen, a student from Finland, and they married in 1953. The young couple moved to London, and George continued his PhD study, working on muscle spindle innervation, using optical microscopy, and then electron microscopy, which was a very new technology at the time.

== Career and research ==
=== Achievements ===
Edward George Gray came to the Anatomy Department at University College London (UCL) in 1955 to work as a postdoctoral assistant to John Z. Young. During that time, working with J. David Robertson, Gray developed crucial improvements in the methods of fixing tissues for electron microscopy studies; staining with phosphotungstic acid, embedding in Araldite.

In 1959, he published a seminal paper on the synaptic structure in mammalian neocortex, describing a specialized organelle inside dendritic spines that he named the spine apparatus. In that paper, Gray introduced the distinction between (1) asymmetric synapses that he called Type 1 (postsynaptic density thicker than the presynaptic density, with less regular synaptic vesicles) and (2) symmetric synapses he named Type 2 (pre- and postsynaptic densities of similar thickness, with round, clear vesicles). This distinction gained practical, physiological application when, later, it was shown that, in the cerebral cortex, Type 1 synapses were predominantly glutamatergic, hence excitatory, while Type 2 synapses were mostly GABAergic, inhibitory synapses.

In 1960–1962, Gray collaborated with V. P. Whittaker on a method to obtain synaptosomes which are isolated axon terminals purified by centrifugation. In the same period, Gray discovered axo-axonic synapses in the dorsal horn of the spinal cord, which had been postulated by J. C. Eccles. In 1968, E. George Gray was appointed a Professor (of cytology). In 1970, Gray described the coats of recycling vesicles and proposed that the coats provide a scaffold that determines the vesicle size. A few years later, Barbara Pearse isolated the protein those coats are made of and named it clathrin. In 1972, together with A. R. Lieberman, Gray founded the Journal of Neurocytology and served as its senior editor for several years. At that time, he was considered an authority on the ultrastructure of the central nervous system (CNS), especially of synapses.

=== Honours ===
Gray was elected a Fellow of the Royal Society (FRS) in 1976.

In 1979, Gray was named an honorary member of the American Association for Anatomy.

== Personal life ==
In his later years, E. George Gray suffered from clinical depression, which interfered with his work, and puzzled his doctors as a particularly severe, yet idiopathic case.
