= Cellular extensions =

Structures projecting from cells

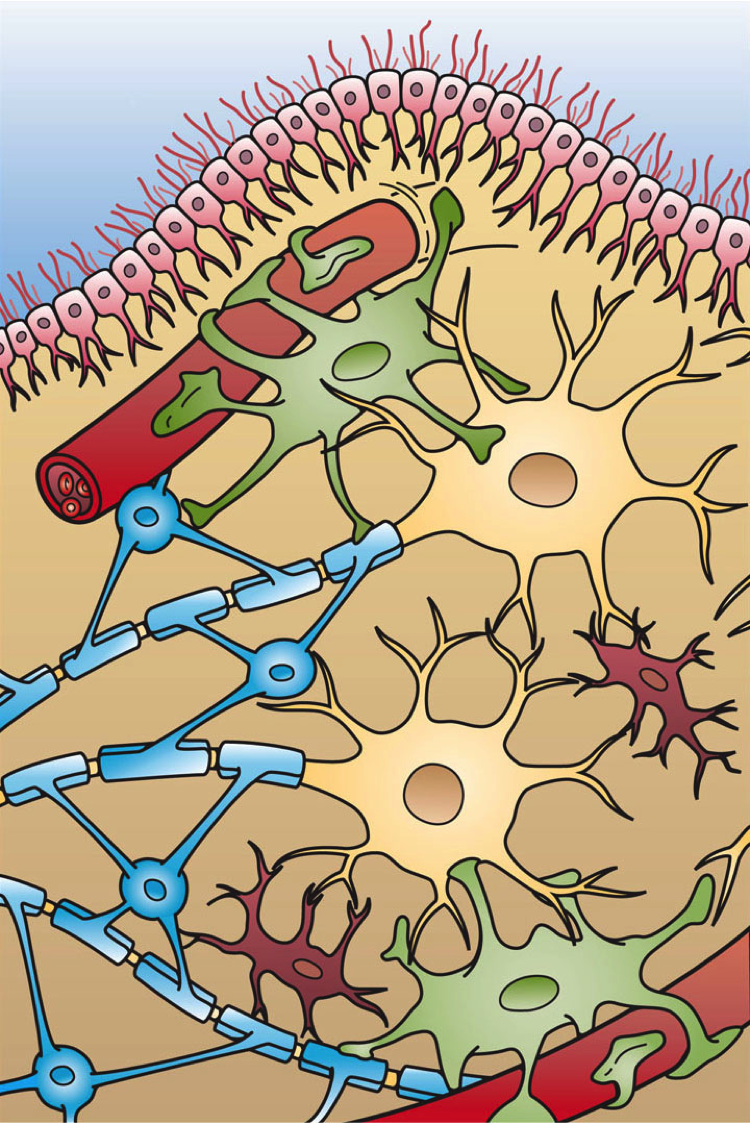
- This schematic illustrates the four different types of glial cells, all of which possess cytoplasmic processes: ependymal cells (light pink), astrocytes (green), microglia (red), and oligodendrocytes (light blue). Cell bodies of neurons are in yellow (Their axons are surrounded by myelin, produced by oligodendrocytes).

Cellular extensions also known as cytoplasmic protrusions and cytoplasmic processes are those structures that project from different cells, in the body, or in other organisms. Many of the extensions are cytoplasmic protrusions such as the axon and dendrite of a neuron, known also as cytoplasmic processes.

Granulosa cells in ovarian follicles project fine cytoplasmic processes to extend through the zona pellucida to keep contact with the enclosed oocyte. These are known as transzonal projections.

Different glial cells project cytoplasmic processes. In the brain, the processes of astrocytes form terminal endfeet, foot processes that help to form protective barriers in the brain. In the kidneys specialised cells called podocytes extend processes that terminate in podocyte foot processes that cover capillaries in the nephron. End-processes may also be known as vascular footplates, and in general may exhibit a pyramidal or finger-like morphology. Mural cells such as pericytes extend processes to wrap around capillaries.

Foot-like processes are also present in Müller glia (modified astrocytes of the retina), pancreatic stellate cells, dendritic cells, oligodendrocytes, and others. Microglia, which are notably smaller than macroglia, can also extend their end-processes to contact areas of capillaries that are devoid of astrocyte endfeet, and thereby contribute to the formation of the glia limitans.

Other cellular extensions that protrude from the cell membrane are known as membrane protrusions or cell protrusions, also cell appendages, such as flagella, and microvilli. Microtentacles are membrane protrusions attached to free-floating malignant tumour cells, associated with the spread of some cancers.The long microtubular processes serve as attachments.

In prokaryotes such protrusions are known as surface or cell-surface appendages and include flagella, pili, fimbriae, and nanowires. Some archaea possess very complex appendages known as hami.

== Types ==
=== Neuronal processes ===
The cytoplasmic processes of a neuron are the axons and dendrites differentiated from the precursor neuronal processes known as neurites. A dendritic spine is a membrane protrusion from a dendrite.

=== Glial processes ===
The processes of glial cells include contractile processes, and processes in astrocytes that terminate in foot processes known as endfeet.

=== Epithelial cell processes ===
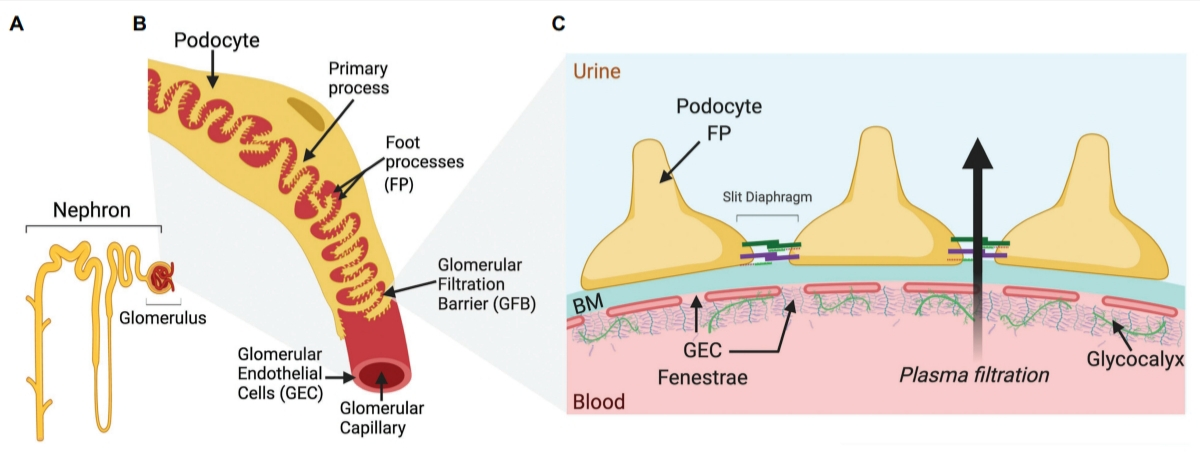
An illustration of podocytes, which surround the glomerular capillaries with their cell bodies, primary processes and interdigitating foot processes.

The podocyte is a highly specialised epithelial cell in Bowman's capsule in the kidney. Primary processes of the podocytes form terminal foot processes. The podocyte foot processes wrap around the glomerular capillaries in the kidney to function in the filtration barrier.

==== Foot processes vs. lamellipodia and filopodia ====
The difference between foot processes, and lamellipodia, which are broad sheet-like protrusions, and filopodia, which are long slender pointed extensions, is that lamellipodia and filopodia are especially significant for cell movement and migration, and they are "macro" membrane protrusions. In contrast, foot processes interact with basement membranes, and are present at the "micro" scale.

Filopodia and lamellipodia in two fluorescently-labeled growth cones.

However, cellular extensions, in general, can be found on a larger "macro" scale, occupying relatively large areas of the cell membrane. For example, microglia can use their primary processes to constantly monitor and evaluate alterations in the brain environment, and they can further deploy thin filopodia from these primary processes to expand their surveillance area.

==== Architectural similarities ====
The arborization and branching of end-processes are one of the features responsible for the structural and functional similarities among various cell types. (Note: This figure illustrates that end-processes of different cells can be considered analogous structures.) Podocytes and pericytes share many physiological properties due to their large surface areas and intricate network of primary and secondary processes that wrap around their associated capillaries.

In addition, foot processes of podocytes and dendritic extensions of neurons exhibit comparable morphological features, and molecular machinery as they both share similar proteins found at both synapses and foot processes, such as synaptopodin and dendrin. This analogy between them is further supported by their shared vulnerability to pathological conditions such as Alzheimer's disease and minimal change nephropathy, both of which are characterized by reduction and damage of dendritic spines and foot processes respectively.

==== Epithelial granulosa cells ====
Granulosa cells in ovarian follicles project fine cytoplasmic processes to extend through the zona pellucida to keep contact with the enclosed oocyte. These are known as transzonal projections. At ovulation the projections rapidly disassociate forom the oocyte.

=== Membrane protrusions ===
Membrane protrusions or cell appendages, extend from the cell membrane, and include microvilli, cilia, and flagella. Microvilli increase the surface area of a tissue, such as from their abundance on tissue protrusions such as intestinal villi.

There is increasing evidence that membrane protrusions may act as platforms for the budding of extracellular vesicles.

Microtentacles are long microtubular processes that extend from free-floating cancer cells that serve as attachments in the spread of some cancers.

Tunneling nanotubes are membrane protrusions that extend to cytoskeletally connect cells that can be distant.

Cytonemes are thin, cellular projections that are specialized for the exchange of signaling proteins between cells. Cytonemes emanate from cells that make signaling proteins, extending directly to cells that receive signaling proteins.

== Structure ==
=== The cytoskeleton ===
One key distinction between cellular processes and lamellipodia lies in the composition of their cytoskeletal elements. While cellular processes can be supported by any of the three major components of the cytoskeleton—microfilaments (actin filaments), intermediate filaments (IFs), or microtubules—, lamellipodia are primarily driven by the polymerization of actin microfilaments, not microtubules.

Microtubules are generally unable to generate the force required by lamellipodia for large-scale cell movement, as this requires a significant number of microtubules to reach the cell's leading edge in order to produce sufficient force to promote the development of significant protrusions and motility. As a result, lamellipodia are predominantly actin-based rather than microtubule-based.

On the other hand, cellular processes can be:

- Microtubule-based: Similar to neurons and dendritic cells, microtubules form the main structural core of primary processes of podocytes. In addition, oligodendrocytes possess two distinct types of microtubules:
1. Radial microtubules: They are located in the proximal regions of the ramified processes of oligodendrocytes, that extend outward from the cell body.
2. Lamellar microtubules: They are the microtubules that eventually wrap around the axon, forming the myelin sheath.
- Actin-based: These include terminal foot processes of podocytes and dendritic spines (small protrusions arising from dendrites).
- IF-based: The predominant cytoskeletal element within astrocyte processes at birth is microtubules. However, as these cells mature, a significant shift occurs, with microtubules being almost completely replaced by intermediate filaments (IFs), composed predominantly of glial fibrillary acidic protein (GFAP), found in the end-feet of Müller cells and astrocytes.

Numerous imaging methods, such as immunohistochemistry and fluorescence microscopy, have enabled the precise targeting of, and are currently used to identify, visualize and localize specific marker proteins in foot processes, such as GFAP and synaptopodin. Such techniques can be used to stain and study cells or identify relevant pathological changes.

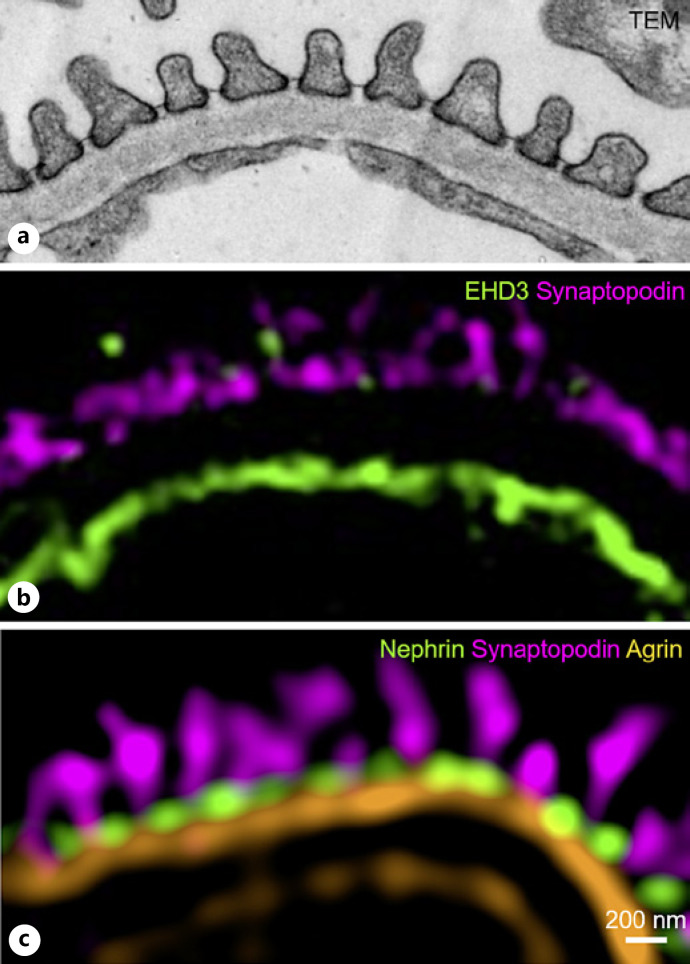
3D Structured illumination microscopy (SIM) enables visualisation of the glomerular filtration barrier, using multiplex immunofluorescence staining for markers for podocytes (synaptopodin, nephrin), endothelial cells (EHD3), and the glomerular basement membrane (agrin).

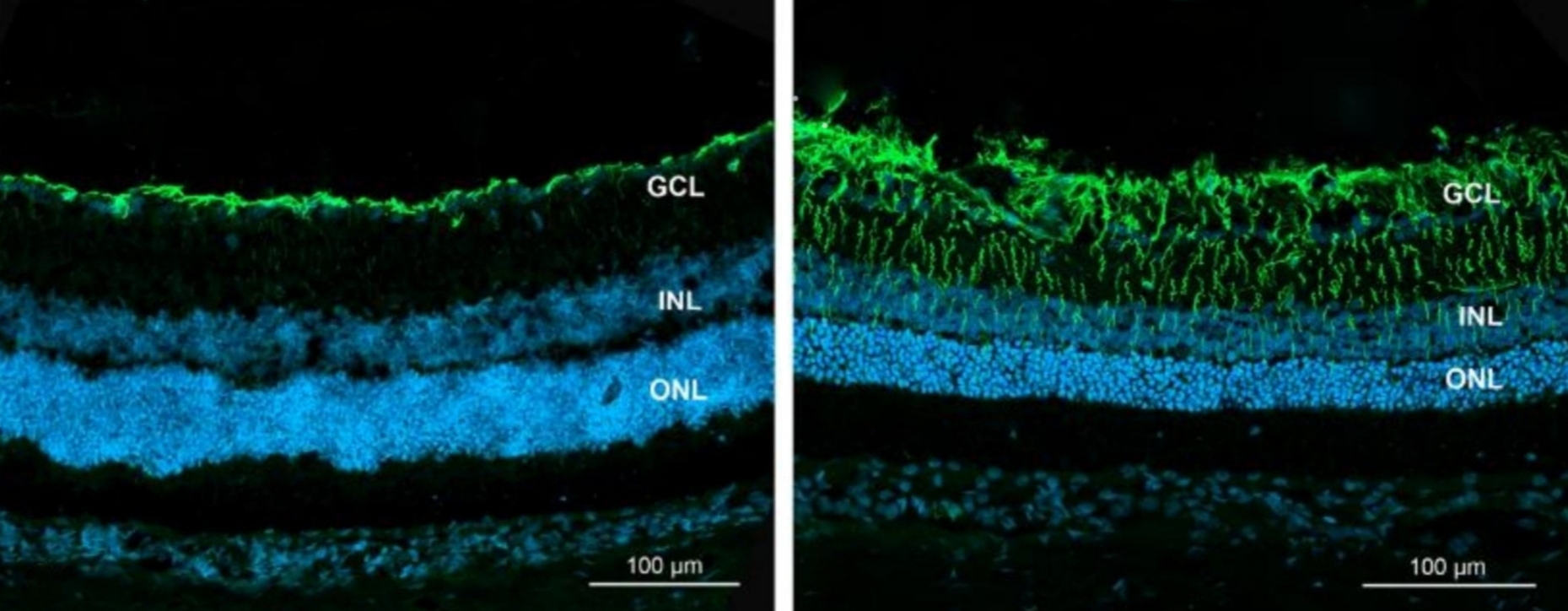
Confocal microscopy can reveal changes in the processes of Müller cells, in the retina, shown here in the rat. On the left, GFAP expression is predominant in the inner retinal layers. localized to the innermost layers of the retina; on the right GFAP-positive fibers show a thickening in Müller cell processes indicating gliosis.

=== The mitochondria ===
In cells with unique architecture, energy requirements can vary significantly among different cellular compartments. As a result, mitochondria, within such cells, demonstrate a non-uniform distribution, and can be strategically localized in regions with the greatest energy needs.

In order to support the substantial metabolic demands of neurovascular coupling, astrocytic endfeet are loaded and packed with elongated and branched mitochondria. This represents a marked departure from the typical pattern, wherein mitochondria generally tend to become smaller as their distance from the cell body increases, particularly within the fine branches and branchlets.

However, while fine astrocytic perisynaptic processes can only house the smallest mitochondria, perivascular endfeet present a notable exception, and they can accommodate significantly more complex and ramified mitochondria. In cases of traumatic brain injury and subsequent blood-brain barrier disruption, there is even further augmentation in mitochondrial number and density within astrocytic endfeet in order to facilitate vascular remodeling as an adaptive response.

On the contrary, foot processes of podocytes are devoid of mitochondria, and mitochondria are confined to the cytosol surrounding the nucleus. The absence of mitochondria in foot processes can be attributed to the apparent size disparity, since mitochondria are generally larger than foot processes (The diameter of foot processes of normal podocytes can be under 250 nm).

As a result, foot processes rely on glycolysis for their energy supply, which may be beneficial as glycolysis offers the advantage of being unrestricted by a maximum capacity. Mitochondria, on the other hand, have a maximal limit, that renders them incapable of generating additional energy upon increased demand.

==== Energy requirements of foot processes of podocytes ====
Podocytes require a significant amount of energy to preserve the structural integrity of their foot processes, given the substantial mechanical stress they endure during the glomerular filtration process.

Dynamic changes in glomerular capillary pressure exert both tensile and stretching forces on podocyte foot processes, and can lead to mechanical strain on their cytoskeleton. Concurrently, fluid flow shear stress is generated by the movement of glomerular ultrafiltrate, exerting a tangential force on the surface of these foot processes.

In order to preserve their intricate foot process architecture, podocytes require a substantial ATP expenditure to maintain their structure and cytoskeletal organization, counteract the elevated glomerular capillary pressure and stabilize the capillary wall.

It has also been suggested that podocytes may possess a reasonable degree of mobility along the glomerular basement membrane, a process that may also contribute to the high energy demand. Since filtered proteins may become entrapped and accumulate under podocyte cell body and major processes, a hypothesized strategy to facilitate the removal of these stagnant proteins involves a cyclical movement of podocytes, allowing trapped proteins to be dispersed from the subpodocyte space into the filtrate.

== Function ==
End-processes are integral to the structure of diverse membranes and sheaths, and perivascular cells play a crucial role in the formation and maintenance of organ-blood barriers:

The interface	Associated end-processes
The blood-brain barrier and the blood-spinal cord barrier	Pericytes and astrocytes endfeet (Astrocytic endfeet envelop the abluminal surface of brain capillaries, accounting for 70% to nearly 100% of their total surface area).
The inner blood retinal barrier (iBRB)	Pericytes and endfeet of glial cells like astrocytes and Müller cells.
The glomerular filtration barrier	Foot processes of podocytes.
The glia limitans	Astrocytic endfeet.
The myelin sheath	Oligodendrocytes.

=== Regulation of blood flow ===
Cellular extensions of certain mural cells possess the capability to regulate the diameter of their associated blood vessels. Through the processes of vasoconstriction and vasodilation, these cells can actively control the rate of blood flow by means of:

- Contraction of cellular processes that encircle capillaries as in pericytes, which possess contractile proteins such as α-actin, tropomyosin, and myosin enabling them to contract and relax.
- Synthesis of vasomodulatory eicosanoids as in astrocytic endfeet. These endfeet are able to produce prostaglandin E2 (PGE2), a potent vasodilator, and 20-hydroxyeicosatetraenoic acid (20-HETE), a vasoconstrictor, both of which exert their effects on vascular smooth muscle cells in arterioles and pericytes in capillaries, leading to the vasodilation and vasoconstriction respectively.

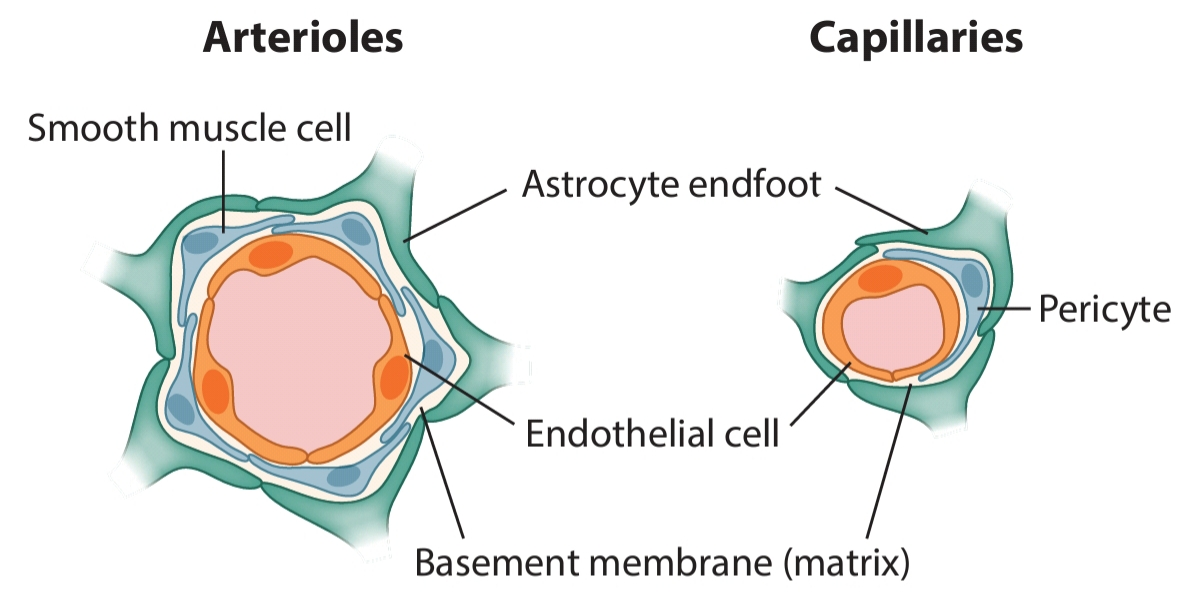
Vasoactive modulators, released from astrocytic endfeet, act on smooth muscle cells in arterioles, and pericytes in capillaries to regulate the vascular tone.

=== Barrier and permeability regulation ===
Podocytes, through their intricate network of foot processes, strictly control the passage of plasma proteins into the urinary ultrafiltrate. Podocytes establish a selective barrier between their foot processes, allowing only molecules of appropriate size and charge to traverse. The negatively charged glycocalyx coating the foot processes facing the urinary space further enhances this barrier, creating an electrostatic repulsion that impedes the filtration of albumin.

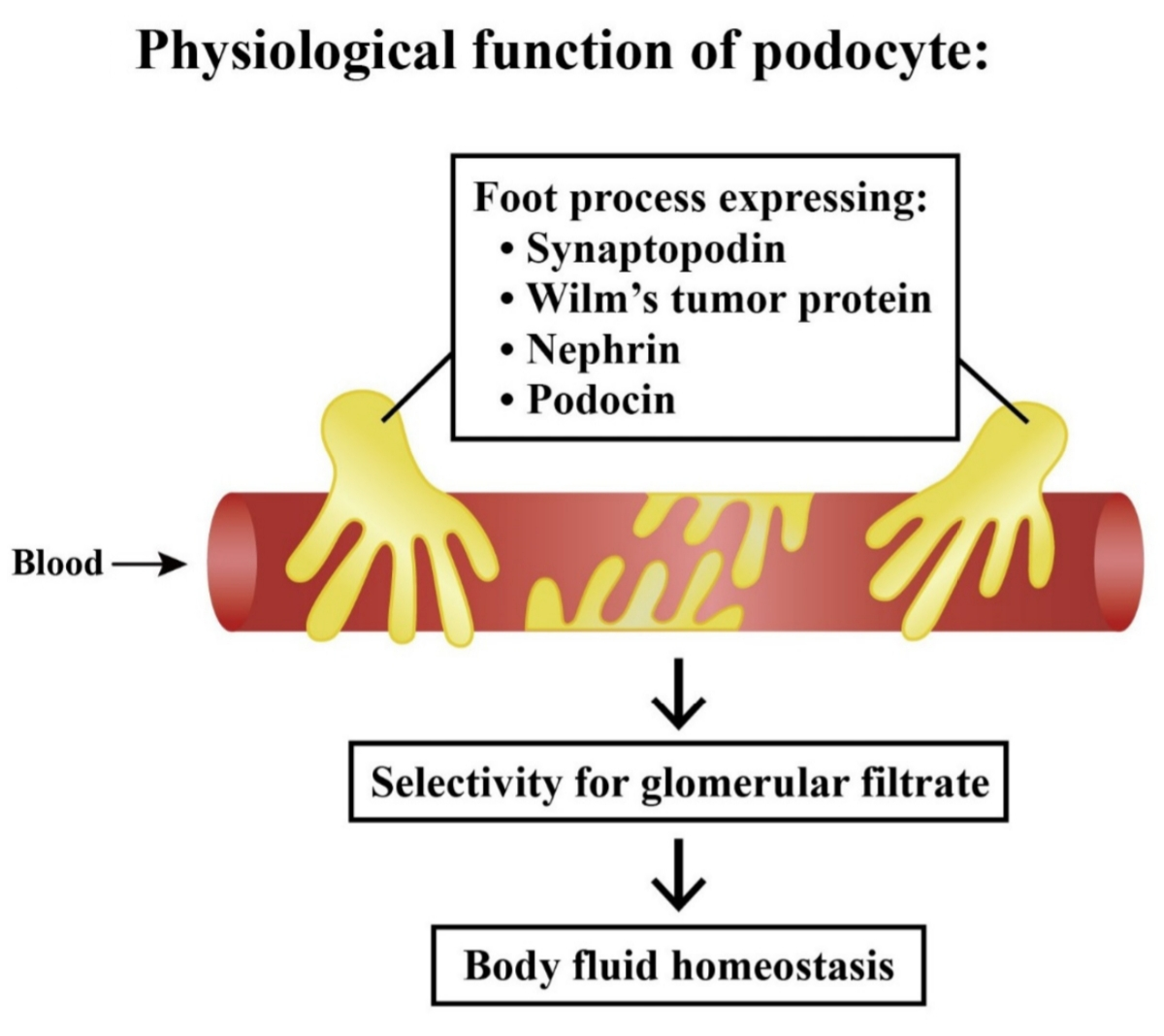
Glomerular podocytes possess a diverse array of surface-expressed proteins that contribute to the selective filtration of solutes across the glomerular barrier, thereby maintaining fluid homeostasis within the body.

=== Uptake and flux of ions, water and nutrients ===
Astrocytic endfeet are rich in:

- GLUT1 transporters, responsible for the transport of glucose across the BBB into astrocytes (This is in contrast to GLUT3 transporters that are localized on the neural end-processes).
- L-type amino acid transporter (LAT), responsible for transporting large neutral amino acids across the BBB.
- Aquaporin-4 water channels, responsible for water and potassium homeostasis.

=== Cellular interaction ===
==== Osteocytes ====
The vascularization of bone is a metabolically demanding process, requiring substantial energy to support the proliferation and migration of endothelial cells. As a result, capillaries which arise from the bone marrow, and then pass through the cortical (outer) layer of bone, known as transcortical vessels (TCVs), require a robust supply of mitochondria to facilitate vascular development.

Osteocytes, the most common cell type within mature cortical bone, actively participate in the growth and maintenance of TCVs through the transfer of mitochondria to endothelial cells. Scanning electron microscopy images have revealed that osteocytes possess numerous dendritic processes with expanded, endfoot-like structures. These endfeet directly abut and communicate with TCVs, establishing a close physical association that enables the transfer of mitochondria, and thereby provide the endothelial cells with the energy necessary for vascularization.

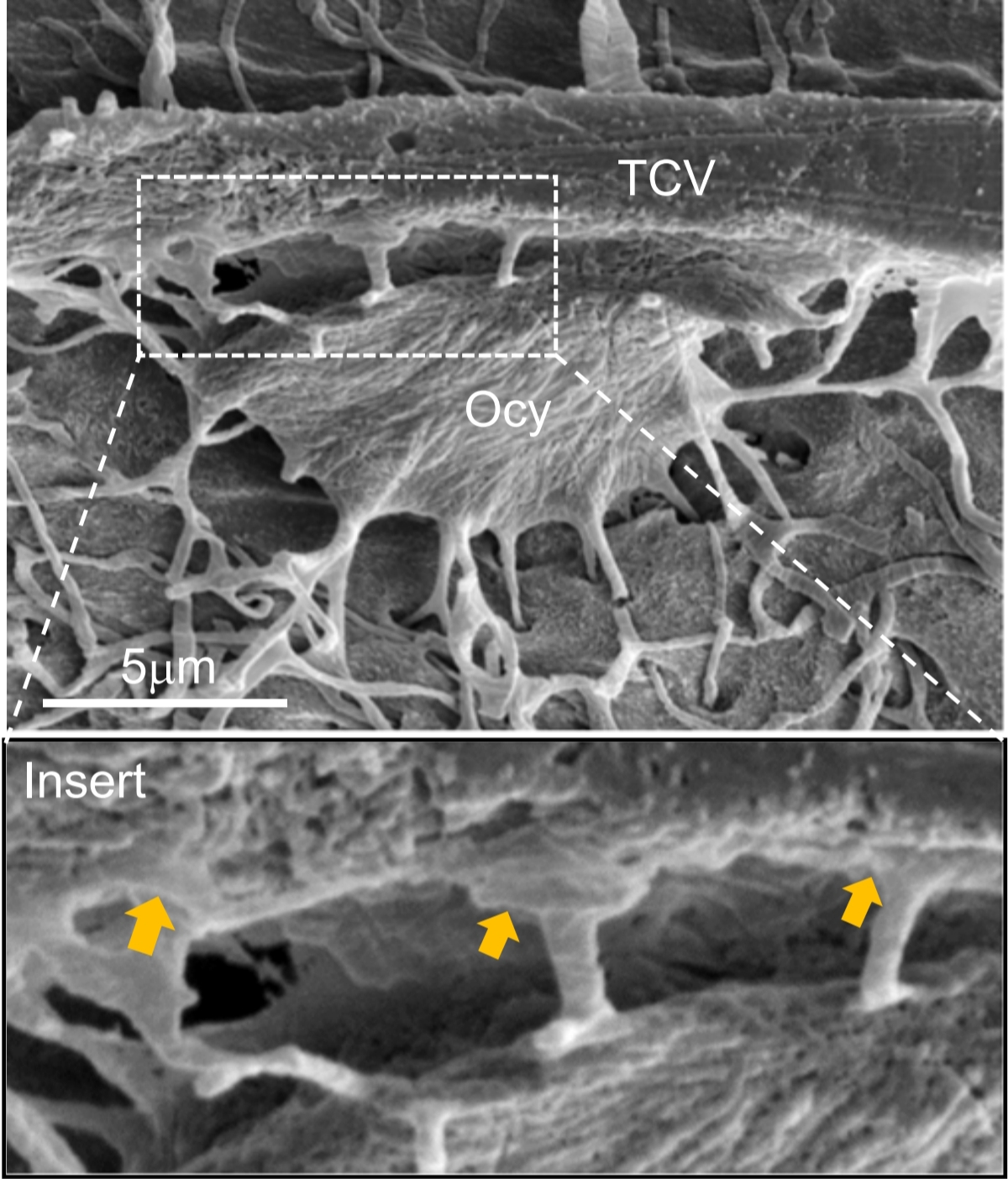
This SEM image illustrates the communication between osteocytes (Ocy) and transcortical vessels (TCV) via their endfeet (yellow arrows) to facilitate mitochondrial transfer.

==== Pericytes ====
While chemical signalling pathways have long been recognized as key mediators of intercellular communication, recent studies have highlighted the significance of direct physical interactions in facilitating coordinated cellular responses. For example, pericyte secondary processes establish contact with endothelial cells, resulting in the formation of peg-socket invaginations, where pericyte processes extend inward, forming indentations within the endothelial cell membrane.

During the process of angiogenesis, newly formed microvessels typically consist of rapidly dividing endothelial cells and an immature basement membrane. Subsequent maturation of these microvessels involves the recruitment of pericytes. The presence of pericytes surrounding blood vessels is often associated with the inhibition of endothelial cell proliferation and the stabilization of newly formed microvessels.

In diabetic retinopathy (DR), accumulation of toxic substances such as advanced glycation end-products (AGEs) leads to pericyte loss, weakening of capillary walls, and microaneurysms, all are hallmarks of DR. Abnormal changes in pericyte mechanical stiffness can impair their ability to maintain the arrest of capillary endothelial cell growth, which may be involved in angiogenesis, neovascularization, and proliferative DR.

==== Cytotoxic T cells ====
Traditionally, CD8^{+} T-cells, responsible for combating intracellular pathogens, are required to undergo a multi-step migration process to reach infected organs. This process involves rolling along the endothelial surface, firm adhesion to the endothelium, and subsequent extravasation into the surrounding tissue. Nevertheless, in the liver, the fenestrated endothelium of hepatic sinusoids allows for direct contact between CD8^{+} T-cells and the hepatocytes.

In case of viral or bacterial infection of hepatocytes, platelets have been observed to form clusters within the sinusoids of the liver and adhere to the surface of infected Kupffer cells. This aggregation is believed to serve as a mechanism for trapping pathogens and promoting their elimination by the immune system.

CD8^{+} T-cells, encountering platelet aggregates within liver sinusoids, are arrested and actively migrate along these sinusoids. They stretch out foot-like processes through the sinusoidal pores into the space of Disse, and then scan hepatocytes for detection of infected cells. (Note: This figure illustrates the formation of foot-like processes of CD8^{+} T-cells upon encountering platelet aggregates.) Upon recognition of antigens, these T cells initiate a cytotoxic response characterized by producing cytokines and killing infected cells without the need for extravasation into the liver parenchyma.

==== Microglia ====
Microglia, while primarily known for their immunological functions, exhibit remarkable plasticity, enabling them to perform a diverse range of roles within the central nervous system. Traditionally, microglia have been characterized as existing in two distinct morphological states that correlate with changes in their functional properties:

	The ramified state	The amoeboid state
Morphology	Microglia are extensively branched with numerous primary and secondary processes.	Microglia are rounded with compact cell body and retracted processes.
Physiological functions	They scan the central nervous system, and establish contacts with neurons, astrocytes and blood vessels.	Exhibiting a high degree of motility, they migrate to the lesion site and demonstrate a potent phagocytic capacity for the clearance of debris and the elimination of pathogens.
	Ramified microglia in a rat cortex before traumatic brain injury.	Amoeboid microglia after traumatic brain injury.

== Organelle extensions ==
Some organelles project extensions such as stromules from plastids in plant cells, peroxules from peroxisomes, and matrixules from mitochondria.

== Clinical significance ==
=== Foot process effacement ===
Foot process effacement (FPE) is a pathological condition, where podocyte foot processes withdraw from their usual interdigitating position, retract into the primary processes of podocytes, and eventually fuse with the cell bodies, resulting in the formation of broad sheet-like extensions over the glomerular basement membrane (GBM).

The podocyte cell bodies no longer maintain their typical position "floating" within the filtrate above the GBM. Instead, they become broadly adherent to it, resulting in the near-complete obliteration of the subpodocyte space, the region beneath the podocyte cell body and major processes.

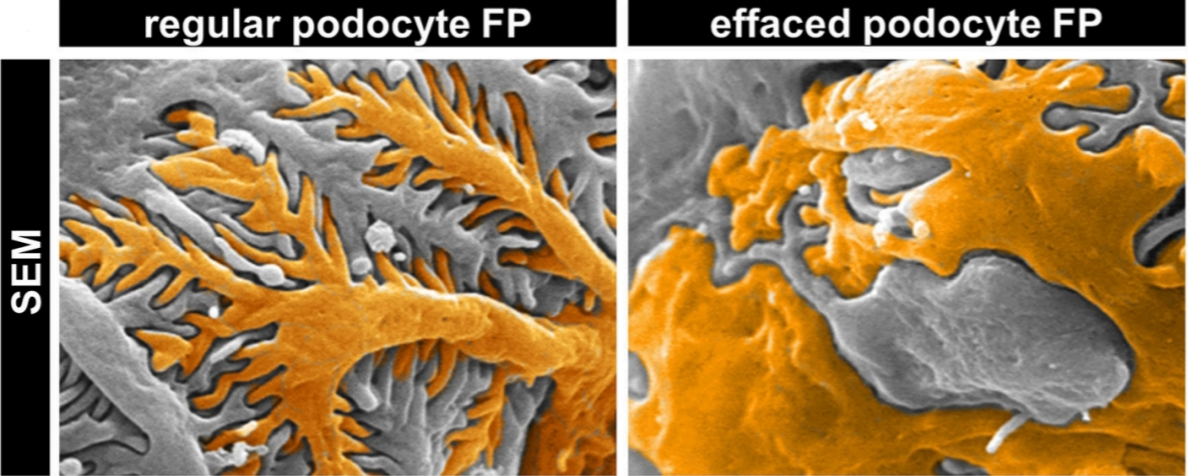
Effacement of foot processes (FP) of podocytes is evident in this scanning electron microscopy (SEM) image, enhanced with false coloring for improved visualization.

FPE is a typical finding in proteinuric glomerular diseases, including minimal change disease (MCD), membranous nephropathy, diabetic kidney disease, and IgA nephropathy. FPE is hypothesized to be an adaptive mechanism in response to glomerular stress, rather than a mere consequence of cell injury and disease.

For example, in inflammatory diseases such as anti-GBM glomerulonephritis, inflammatory mediators and the activation of the complement cascade can damage the attachment of the actin cytoskeleton in foot processes to the GBM, thereby increasing the risk of podocyte detachment from the GBM.

As a result, podocytes undergo cytoskeletal reorganization, resulting in the formation of a robust, basal cytoskeletal network that is tightly adhered to the GBM in order to minimize the risk of podocyte detachment. Even in cases of extensive FPE, recovery from effacement is possible if the disease resolves or with therapeutic intervention, and podocytes can restore their foot processes to their normal interdigitating state.

=== Staphylococcus epidermidis infections ===
Staphylococcus epidermidis, a common bacterium found as a normal commensal on human skin, is a significant cause of hospital-acquired infections that are associated with the use of implanted medical devices like heart valves and catheters.

This bacterium can reach the bloodstream as a contaminant from the skin, adhering to an implant using various mechanisms. In addition to producing a slimy substance, S. epidermidis can anchor itself to the surface of the implant using foot-like processes. These projections (appendages) extend from the bacterial cell wall and attach to the implant in linear arrangements, either singly or in multiples. (Note: This figure illustrates the foot-like processes that S. epidermidis use to anchor itself to the surface of the implant.)

=== Aquaporin-4 ===
==== Neuromyelitis optica spectrum disorder ====
Neuromyelitis optica spectrum disorder (NMOSD) is an autoimmune inflammatory disease characterized by the presence of serum antibodies directed against the water channel protein aquaporin-4 (AQP-4). These antibodies initiate a complement-dependent inflammatory cascade, culminating in tissue damage and destruction.

Given that AQP4 is primarily expressed on perivascular astrocytic endfeet in the spinal cord and by Müller cells in the retina, NMOSD preferentially affects the spinal cord, and the anterior visual system.

Patients with NMOSD typically exhibit worse visual acuity compared to those with multiple sclerosis (MS), because NMOSD is primarily an inflammatory process targeting astrocytes, with demyelination as a secondary consequence. In contrast, MS primarily involves inflammatory demyelination.

Since NMOSD targets Müller cells, which provide trophic support to the retina, and have a heightened expression of AQP4 in their endfeet facing blood vessels, it is evident that NMOSD can have a more severe impact on visual acuity.

==== Alzheimer's disease ====
AQP-4 exhibits a polarized distribution in astrocytes, with a 10-times higher concentration in astrocytic endfeet, which are in contact with blood vessels, compared to non-endfoot regions.

In contrast to the lateral membranes of numerous epithelial cell types, astrocyte lateral membranes are devoid of tight junctions, that prevent diffusion of membrane molecules. In order to maintain their polarization and orientation towards blood vessels, AQP-4 channels must be securely anchored by specialized proteins.

Recent studies have revealed a correlation between multiple neurological disorders, and the loss of AQP4 polarity (i.e. when AQP4 are widely distributed throughout the astrocyte, instead of its typical localization at the endfeet).

AQP-4 facilitates the flow of cerebrospinal fluid through the brain parenchyma from para-arterial to para-venous spaces, and thus AQP4 channels facilitate the clearance of waste products from the brain, thereby preventing their accumulation. (Note: This figure illustrates the mechanism of AQP-4 dysfunction in Alzheimer's disease.) In Alzheimer's disease (AD), a disruption in the polarity of AQP4 can cause a buildup of waste products, such as amyloid beta and tau proteins, a defining characteristic of AD.

This also explains why patients with NMSOD are at higher risk of developing AD, since damage of AQP4 in NMSOD may impair clearance of amyloid-beta.

=== Epiretinal membrane ===
An epiretinal membrane (ERM) is an eye disease, where a greyish semi-translucent membrane progressively grows over the macula, leading to decreased visual acuity, metamorphopsia, and other complaints. ERM commonly occurs due to posterior vitreous detachment, which can cause a tear in the internal limiting membrane (ILM), allowing microglial cells to migrate through the disrupted retinal architecture and interact with other cells at the vitreo-retinal interface, ultimately contributing to the formation of ERM.

The standard surgical treatment for symptomatic ERMs is pars plana vitrectomy with membrane peel. However, despite the apparent complete removal of the ERM, there remains a risk of recurrence, which can be attributed to the presence of residual microscopic ERM remnants and the potential role of Müller cell footplates in the internal limiting membrane (ILM) in facilitating further cell proliferation and membrane formation. Minimising recurrence can therefore be achieved through peeling the underlying ILM together with the ERM.

However, ILM peeling may result in the unintended damage of Müller cells, thereby increasing the risk of complications such as development of dissociated optic nerve fiber layer (DONFL), probably due to trauma to Müller cell footplate, and concomitant alterations in the nerve fiber layer and ganglion cell layer. As a result, intraoperative optical coherence tomography (iOCT)-guided ERM removal is an alternative approach that may minimize the risk of recurrence without the need for routine ILM peeling.
