= Spine apparatus =

The spine apparatus (SA) is a specialized form of endoplasmic reticulum (ER) that is found in a subpopulation of dendritic spines in central neurons. It was discovered by Edward George Gray in 1959 when he applied electron microscopy to fixed cortical tissue. The SA consists of a series of stacked discs that are connected to each other and to the dendritic system of ER-tubules. The actin binding protein synaptopodin (which was originally described in podocytes of the kidney) is an essential component of the SA. Mice that lack the gene for synaptopodin do not form a spine apparatus. The SA is believed to play a role in synaptic plasticity, learning and memory, but the exact function of the spine apparatus is still enigmatic.

== Morphology ==
The spine apparatus consists of membranous saccules (discs) and tubules surrounded by wispy filamentous material and is mainly found in large mushroom-shaped dendritic spines. The wispy filamentous material is the cytoskeletal network, mainly f-actin, which is responsible for the maintenance and alteration of spine shape. The spine apparatus is connected to the smooth-surfaced endoplasmic reticulum of the dendrite. Consisting of continuous parallel flattened cisternae, the spine apparatus has a large surface area which is important for its function.

The spine apparatus occupies a large portion of the volume of the spine stalk, which may increase the longitudinal resistance between spine and dendrite Therefore, the spine apparatus could have a direct effect on the membrane potential of the spine plasma membrane when the synapse is active. The connection to the smooth endoplasmic reticulum suggests a potential pathway for the transfer of proteins and lipids between the spine and dendrite. The spine apparatus could also function as a reservoir for calcium ions.

== Function ==
=== Local protein synthesis and trafficking ===
For some time, the function of the spine apparatus has been considered enigmatic. Recent evidence, however, suggests the spine apparatus may possess several distinct functions. After elucidating the structure of the spine apparatus, Spacek and Harris noted a continuation of the smooth endoplasmic reticulum into the spine apparatus, where it then takes on a lamellar structure. This observation suggests the SA might play a role in vesicular transport, although a specific mechanism is not yet clear.

Furthermore, Pierce et al. proposed that the spine apparatus may be involved in post-translational protein processing, similar to that observed in the Golgi apparatus, and function in the post-translational processing of GluR1 and GluR2 subunits, which are locally translated in dendritic spines, of AMPA receptors. The spine apparatus has also been shown to be involved in the post-translational processing and spatial delivery of NMDA receptors, which also function as glutamate receptors and play a significant role in controlling synaptic plasticity.

The appearance of molecular markers for satellite secretory pathways provides further evidence that the spine apparatus plays a role in local integral membrane protein translocation and processing. More specifically, the protein translocation site marker (Sec61α) and the Golgi cisternae markers (giantin and α-mannosidase II) have been observed in the spine apparatus.

=== Calcium signaling ===
Figure 2. Calcium uptake and calcium release by the spine apparatus

Synaptic activity triggers Ca^{2+} influx into dendritic spines via NMDA receptors and voltage-dependent calcium channels. Free Ca^{2+} ions are rapidly removed from the cytoplasm through Na+/Ca2+ exchangers in the plasma membrane and by sarco/endoplasmic reticulum Ca^{2+} ATPases (SERCA pumps) that mediate Ca^{2+} uptake into the smooth endoplasmic reticulum (sER). The spine apparatus, as a sub-compartment of the sER, has a large surface area and is thought to act as an efficient calcium buffer inside the spine (Figure 2).

Recent studies have shown that the spine apparatus is also able to release Ca^{2+} through inositol trisphosphate receptors (IP3Rs) or ryanodine receptors (RyRs). The calcium-sensitive nature of IP3Rs and RyRs makes both receptors capable of regenerative calcium-induced calcium release (CICR). In dendritic shafts and spines of hippocampal neurons the presence of both RyRs and IP3Rs has been shown by immunostaining. Ca^{2+} release is triggered by glutamate release, activating Group I metabotropic glutamate receptors (mGluRs). The downstream signaling cascade leads to elevated IP_{3} levels inside the spine (Figure 2) which trigger Ca^{2+} release events only in those spines that contain sER. Specifically, CICR activates RyR mostly located at the base of dendritic spines, while SERCA pumps are located in the spine head. This asymmetry organization of RyR versus SERCA leads to fast calcium signaling at the base of the dendritic spine, leading to SA calcium depletion. Calcium is finally refilled by ORAI-STIM1 mostly located in clusters in the spine head. The slow calcium influx through this store operated Calcium Entry (SOCE) prevents activation of the RyR triggered by fast synaptic inputs.

=== Plasticity ===
The spine apparatus' ability to release calcium into the cytosol is thought to contribute to the development of synaptic plasticity. This was first shown in an experiment using synaptopodin(SP)-deficient mice, which do not show a spine apparatus in dendritic spines. These SP-deficient mice showed a decrease in long-term potentiation (LTP). Furthermore, LTP1 (short-term plasticity which requires post-translational protein modifications, but is protein synthesis independent), LTP2 (slowly decaying plasticity which is protein synthesis-dependent but does not require gene transcription modifications), and LTP3 (long-lasting LTP that is translation- and transcription-dependent) were decreased as a result of the absence of the spine apparatus.

Further studies have shown that altered expression and distribution of RyRs, IP3Rs, and L-type voltage-dependent calcium channels (L-VDCCs) can decrease LTP1, LTP2, and LTP3. This observation, combined with the observation that SP-deficient mice have decreased LTP, suggests the proper expression and distribution of calcium channels within the spine apparatus is required for controlling synaptic plasticity. Moreover, the spine apparatus is critical for maintaining the cytosolic calcium levels which are central to the formation of synaptic plasticity.

SP-deficient mice also exhibited behavioral changes, including decreased horizontal locomotor activity, decreased anxiety, and a decreased ability to acquire LTP3-related spatial memory, as shown in a radial arm maze. The decreased locomotor activity and decreased spatial learning suggest the spine apparatus' role in inducing cerebellar LTP, in addition to hippocampal LTP. The exact mechanisms of these deficiencies are not fully understood. These behavioral modifications are thought to be epiphenomena of the absence of a spine apparatus and the changes in cytosolic calcium control mechanisms typically provided by the spine apparatus.

Synaptopodin, a protein that binds actin and α-actinin-2, is closely associated with the spine apparatus. Although SP-deficient mature mice both lack the spine apparatus and display impaired LTP, the relationship between SP, the spine apparatus, and plasticity is complicated by the following three findings: (1) In addition to being associated with the spine apparatus, SP is also located in the cisternal organelle, which is structurally similar to the spine apparatus. (2) The spine apparatus is generally found in mushroom spines of mature neurons, but ample levels of SP and expression of LTP have been detected in juvenile rats just 15 days old. (3) Unlike SP, the spine apparatus has not been found in cultured neurons.

Direct evidence for an essential function of the spine apparatus in mGluR-dependent long-term depression (LTD) has been provided by comparing plasticity of synapses on spines with or without spine apparatus. In this study, only synapses associated with sER displayed this form of depression. Blocking IP_{3}-mediated Ca^{2+} release blocked synaptic depression, indicating a causal role of the spine apparatus in the induction of mGluR-dependent LTD.
