= Acylphosphatase =

Enzyme

acylphosphatase
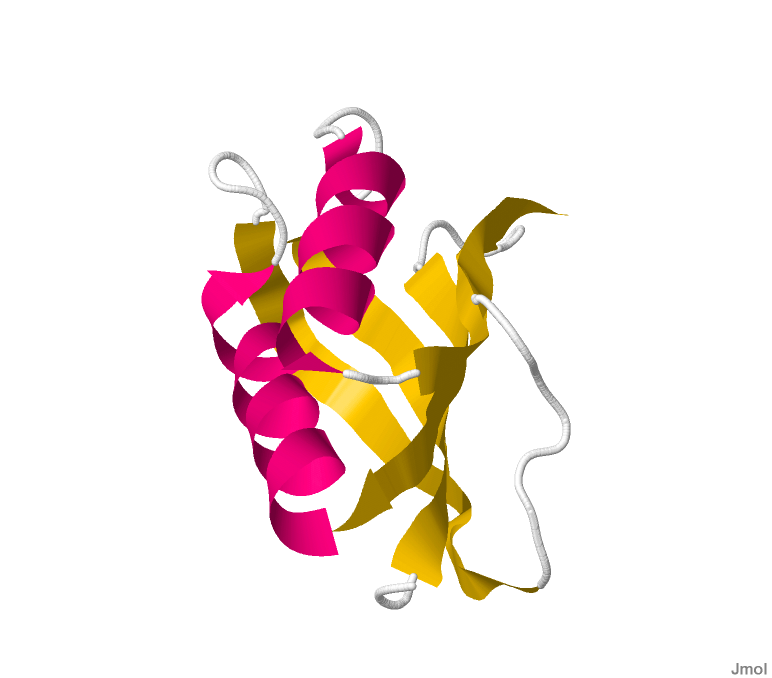

Identifiers
- EC no.: 3.6.1.7
- CAS no.: 9012-34-4

Databases
- IntEnz: IntEnz view
- BRENDA: BRENDA entry
- ExPASy: NiceZyme view
- KEGG: KEGG entry
- MetaCyc: metabolic pathway
- PRIAM: profile
- PDB structures: RCSB PDB PDBe PDBsum
- Gene Ontology: AmiGO / QuickGO
Search
- PMC: articles
- PubMed: articles
- NCBI: proteins

Acylphosphatase
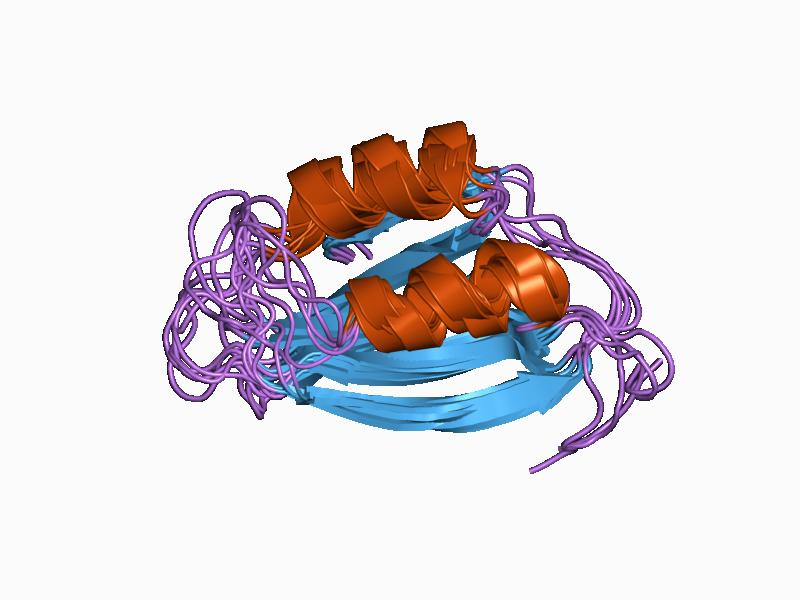
- Structure of acylphosphatase.

Identifiers
- Symbol: Acylphosphatase
- Pfam: PF00708
- InterPro: IPR001792
- PROSITE: PDOC00136
- SCOP2: 1aps / SCOPe / SUPFAM
Available protein structures:
- Pfam: structures / ECOD
- PDB: RCSB PDB; PDBe; PDBj
- PDBsum: structure summary
- PDB: 2GV1, 1APS, 2FHM, 1Y9O, 1URR, 1W2I, 2ACY, 2BJD, 1V3Z, 2HLT, 2HLU, 2BJE, 3BR8, 1ULR

In enzymology, an acylphosphatase (EC 3.6.1.7) is an enzyme that catalyzes the hydrolysis of the carboxyl-phosphate bond of acylphosphates, with acylphosphate and H_{2}O as the two substrates of this enzyme, and carboxylate and phosphate as its two products:

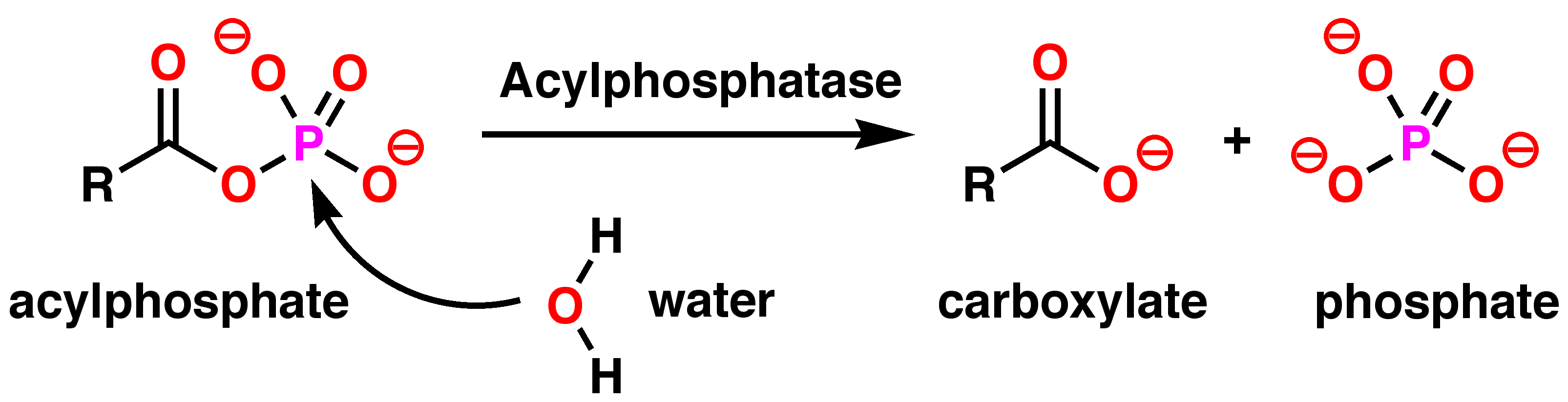

== Function ==
This enzyme belongs to the family of hydrolases, specifically those acting on acid anhydrides in phosphorus-containing anhydrides. The systematic name of this enzyme class is acylphosphate phosphohydrolase. Other names in common use include acetylphosphatase, 1,3-diphosphoglycerate phosphatase, acetic phosphatase, Ho 1-3, and GP 1-3.

This enzyme participates in 3 metabolic pathways:

- glycolysis / gluconeogenesis
- pyruvate metabolism, and
- benzoate degradation via coa ligation.

== Structural studies ==
Structures of this enzyme have been solved by both NMR and X-ray crystallography. See the links to PDB structures in the info boxes on the right for a current list of structures available in the PDB. The protein contains a beta sheet stacked on two alpha helices described by CATH as an Alpha-Beta Plait fold. The active site sits between sheet and helices and contains an arginine and an asparagine. Most structures are monomeric

== Isozymes ==
Humans express the following two acylphosphatase isozymes:

acylphosphatase 1, erythrocyte (common) type

Identifiers
- Symbol: ACYP1
- NCBI gene: 97
- HGNC: 179
- OMIM: 600875
- RefSeq: NM_001107
- UniProt: P07311

Other data
- EC number: 3.6.1.7
- Locus: Chr. 14 q24.3
Search for
- Structures: Swiss-model
- Domains: InterPro

acylphosphatase 2, muscle type

Identifiers
- Symbol: ACYP2
- NCBI gene: 98
- HGNC: 180
- OMIM: 102595
- RefSeq: NM_138448
- UniProt: P14621

Other data
- EC number: 3.6.1.7
- Locus: Chr. 2 p16.2
Search for
- Structures: Swiss-model
- Domains: InterPro
