= Microtentacle =

Microtentacles are microtubule-based membrane protrusions that occur in detached cells. They were discovered by scientists studying metastatic breast cancer cells at the University of Maryland, Baltimore.

These novel structures are distinct from classical actin based extensions of adherent cells, persist for days in breast tumor lines that are resistant to apoptosis, and aid in the reattachment to matrix or cell monolayers.

The formation of microtentacles (McTNs) in detached or circulating tumor cells may promote seeding of bloodborne metastatic disease.
