= Synaptosome =

Isolated synaptic terminal from a neuron

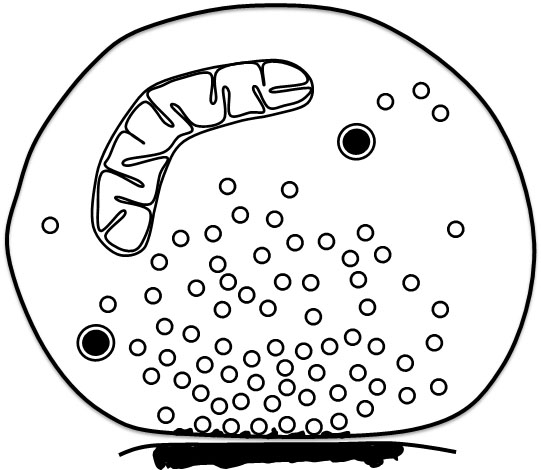
- Schematic of isolated synaptosome with numerous small synaptic vesicles, two dense-core vesicles, one mitochondrion and a patch of postsynaptic membrane attached to the presynaptic active zone

Identifiers
- MeSH: D013574
- TH: H2.00.06.2.00033

A synaptosome is an isolated synaptic terminal from a neuron. Synaptosomes are obtained by mild homogenization of nervous tissue under isotonic conditions and subsequent fractionation using differential and density gradient centrifugation. Liquid shear detaches the nerve terminals from the axon and the plasma membrane surrounding the nerve terminal particle reseals. Synaptosomes are osmotically sensitive, contain numerous small clear synaptic vesicles, sometimes larger dense-core vesicles and frequently one or more small mitochondria. They carry the morphological features and most of the chemical properties of the original nerve terminal. Synaptosomes isolated from mammalian brain often retain a piece of the attached postsynaptic membrane, facing the active zone.

Synaptosomes were first isolated in an attempt to identify the subcellular compartment corresponding to the fraction of so-called bound acetylcholine that remains when brain tissue is homogenized in iso-osmotic sucrose. Particles containing acetylcholine and its synthesizing enzyme choline acetyltransferase were originally isolated by Hebb and Whittaker (1958) at the Agricultural Research Council, Institute of Animal Physiology, Babraham, Cambridge, UK. In a collaborative study with the electron microscopist E. George Gray from University College London, Victor P. Whittaker eventually showed that the acetylcholine-rich particles derived from guinea-pig cerebral cortex were synaptic vesicle-rich pinched-off nerve terminals. Whittaker coined the term synaptosome to describe these fractionation-derived particles and shortly thereafter synaptic vesicles could be isolated from lysed synaptosomes.

Synaptosomes are commonly used to study synaptic transmission in the test tube because they contain the molecular machinery necessary for the uptake, storage, and release of neurotransmitters. In addition they have become a common tool for drug testing. They maintain a normal membrane potential, contain presynaptic receptors, translocate metabolites and ions, and when depolarized, release multiple neurotransmitters (including acetylcholine, amino acids, catecholamines, and peptides) in a Ca2+-dependent manner. Synaptosomes isolated from the whole brain or certain brain regions are also useful models for studying structure-function relationships in synaptic vesicle release. Synaptosomes can also be isolated from tissues other than brain such as spinal cord, retina, myenteric plexus or the electric ray electric organ. Synaptosomes may be used to isolate postsynaptic densities or the presynaptic active zone with attached synaptic vesicles. Accordingly, various subproteomes of isolated synaptosomes, such as synaptic vesicles, synaptic membranes, or postsynaptic densities can now be studied by proteomic techniques, leading to a deeper understanding of the molecular machinery of brain neurotransmission and neuroplasticity.

== See also ==
- Connectome
