= Victor P. Whittaker =

British biochemist (1919–2016)

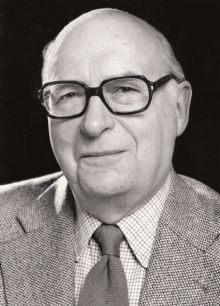
- Victor Percy Whittaker
- Born: Victor Percy Whittaker; 11 June 1919; Ainsdale, England
- Died: 5 July 2016 (aged 97); Cambridge, England
- Known for: Isolation of synaptosomes and synaptic vesicles and biochemistry of synaptic vesicles
- Scientific career
- Fields: Neurobiochemistry and Cholinergic Transmission
- Doctoral advisor: Rudolph Peters
- Doctoral students: Thomas C. Südhof

Victor Percy Whittaker (11 June 1919 – 5 July 2016) was a British biochemist who pioneered studies on the subcellular fractionation of the brain. He did this by isolating synaptosomes and synaptic vesicles from the mammalian brain and demonstrating that synaptic vesicles store the neurotransmitter acetylcholine.

== Biography ==
Victor P. Whittaker was born in Ainsdale, Southport (England). He studied chemistry and biochemistry at Oxford University (1937–41), where he obtained his D. Phil in 1945. He continued as departmental demonstrator and university demonstrator and lecturer in biochemistry, University of Oxford. From 1951–55 he held the position of assistant professor of physiology at the University of Cincinnati, College of Medicine. In 1955 he returned to England to take the position of principal scientific officer (1955–59) and senior principal scientific officer (1959–66) at the Agricultural Research Council Institute of Animal Physiology, Babraham, Cambridge. In 1966 he moved to Cambridge University as Sir William Dunn Reader in Biochemistry, and fellow of university (now Wolfson College). From 1967–71 he acted in addition as chief research scientist at the New York State Institute for Basic Research in Mental Retardation and was visiting professor at the City University of New York (1968–72). From 1973 to 1987 he was director and head of the Department of Neurochemistry at the Max Planck Institute for Biophysical Chemistry in Göttingen, Germany. As an emeritus he continued research in his institute and then at the University of Mainz, Medical Faculty, before he returned to Cambridge. He died in Cambridge in July 2016 at the age of 97.

== Research ==
Whittaker's introduction to biochemical pharmacology took place during World War II as a member of the team that discovered the arsenical antidote dimercaprol (British AntiLewisite), the first antidote ever to result from the planned biochemical study of the action of a toxic chemical. He later pioneered the application of cell biological techniques to the nervous system. In 1960 he discovered that the application of mild liquid shear to brain tissue detached presynaptic nerve terminals from their axons and allowed them to be isolated as sealed structures by the combination of differential and density gradient centrifugation. He named these detached nerve terminals synaptosomes. Synaptosomes have been widely used for the in vitro biochemical analysis of presynaptic function and as a test preparation in pharmaceutical industry, providing the basis of thousands of publications on the biochemistry of synaptic transmission. Using osmotic shock he subsequently showed that intact synaptic vesicles of high purity can be isolated by density gradient centrifugation from lysed synaptosomes. He demonstrated that these vesicles store the neurotransmitter acetylcholine, providing a biochemical basis for the mechanism of quantal transmitter release. Based on earlier work with E. George Gray, it had been hypothesized that the small electron-lucent vesicles observed by electron microscopy in cholinergic nerve terminals contained and released quantal packages of the neurotransmitter. During later work he extended his studies to the isolation of synaptic vesicles from a source that allowed the analysis specifically of cholinergic synaptic vesicles, the electric organ of the ray Torpedo. These studies led to fundamental insights into synaptic vesicle structure and function and the metabolic and structural heterogeneity of synaptic vesicles.

== Selected publications ==
- Gray, E. G.; Whittaker, V. P. (1962). "The isolation of nerve endings from brain: an electron-microscopic study of cell fragments derived by homogenization and centrifugation". Journal of Anatomy. 96 (Pt. 1): 79–88. PMC 1244174. PMID 13901297.
- Whittaker, V. P.; Michaelson, I. A.; Kirkland, R. J. (1964). "The separation of synaptic vesicles from nerve-ending particles ('synaptosomes')". Biochemical Journal. 90 (2): 293–303. doi:10.1042/bj0900293. PMC 1202615. PMID 5834239.
- Sheridan, M. N.; Whittaker, V. P.; Israël, M. (1966). "The subcellular fractionation of the electric organ of Torpedo". Zeitschrift für Zellforschung und mikroskopische Anatomie. 74 (3): 293–307. doi:10.1007/BF00401258. PMID 4168676. S2CID 13201118.
- Whittaker, V. P.; Essman, W. B. T.; Dowe, G. H. (1972). "The isolation of pure cholinergic synaptic vesicles from the electric organs of elasmobranch fish of the family Torpedinidae". Biochemical Journal. 128 (4): 833–845. doi:10.1042/bj1280833. PMC 1173903. PMID 4638794.
- Zimmermann, H.; Whittaker, V. P. (1977). "Morphological and biochemical heterogeneity of cholinergic synaptic vesicles". Nature. 267 (5612): 633–635. Bibcode:1977Natur.267..633Z. doi:10.1038/267633a0. PMID 876386. S2CID 4257576.
- Whittaker, V. P., ed. (1988). The Cholinergic Synapse. Handbook of Experimental Pharmacology. Vol. 86. New York: Springer. ISBN 0-387-18613-1.
- Whittaker, V. P. (1992). The Cholinergic Neuron and Its Target. The Electromotor Innervation of the Electric Ray Torpedo as a Model. Boston: Birkhäuser. ISBN 0-8176-3553-X.
