= FCHSD2 =

Protein-coding gene in the species Homo sapiens

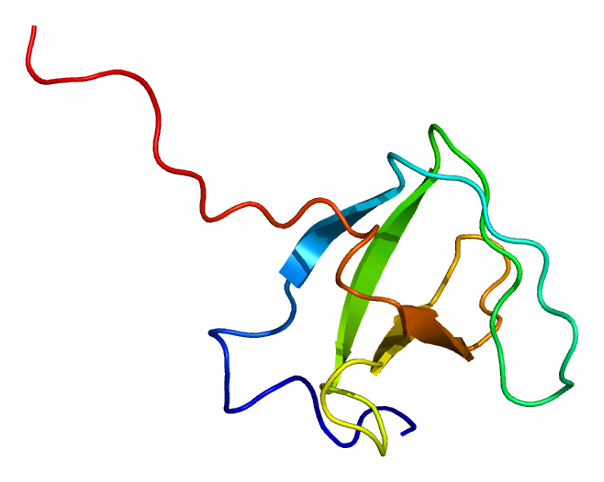

Identifiers
- Aliases: FCHSD2, NWK, SH3MD3, FCH and double SH3 domains 2, NWK1
- External IDs: OMIM: 617556; MGI: 2448475; GeneCards: FCHSD2
Available structures
PDB	Ortholog search: PDBe RCSB
PDB	List of PDB id codes 2DL5, 2DL7

Gene location (Human)
Chr.	Chromosome 11 (human)
Band	11q13.4	Start	72,836,745 bp
Band	11q13.4	End	73,142,318 bp

Gene location (Mouse)
Chr.	Chromosome 7 (mouse)
Band	7|7 E2	Start	100,742,070 bp
Band	7|7 E2	End	100,933,612 bp
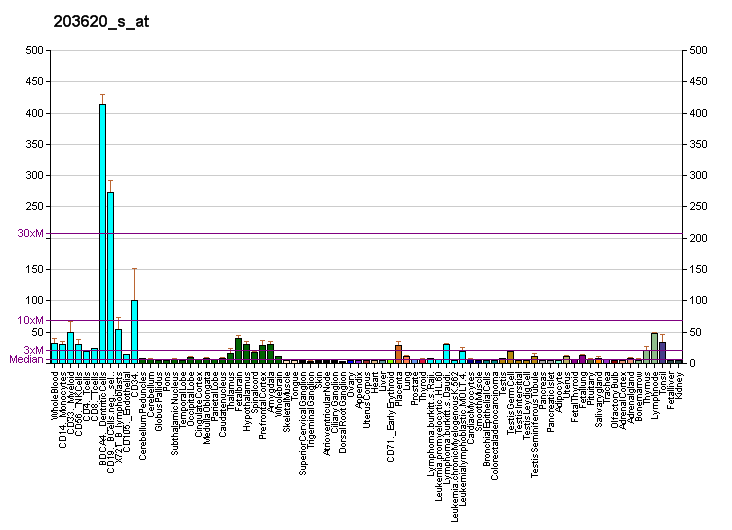
RNA expression pattern
Bgee	Human / Mouse (ortholog); Top expressed in: popliteal artery; tibial arteries; lymph node; right coronary artery; Descending thoracic aorta; ascending aorta; ventricular zone; right lung; left coronary artery; appendix / Top expressed in: zygote; mesenteric lymph nodes; secondary oocyte; primary oocyte; habenula; paraventricular nucleus of hypothalamus; otolith organ; trigeminal ganglion; utricle; epithelium of small intestine; More reference expression data
BioGPS	More reference expression data
Gene ontology
Molecular function	protein binding; phosphatidylinositol-3,4,5-trisphosphate binding; phosphatidylinositol-3,4-bisphosphate binding; lipid binding
Cellular component	neuromuscular junction; recycling endosome; plasma membrane; clathrin-coated pit; stereocilium shaft; cytoplasm; membrane; cell junction; stereocilium; cell projection
Biological process	neuromuscular synaptic transmission; regulation of actin filament polymerization; positive regulation of actin filament polymerization; clathrin-dependent endocytosis; positive regulation of Arp2/3 complex-mediated actin nucleation; endocytosis; protein transport
Sources:Amigo / QuickGO
Orthologs
Databases	NCBI: entry; OMA: entry
Species	Human	Mouse
Entrez	9873	207278
Ensembl	ENSG00000137478	ENSMUSG00000030691
UniProt	O94868	Q3USJ8
RefSeq (mRNA)	NM_014824	NM_001146010; NM_199012
RefSeq (protein)	NP_055639	NP_001139482; NP_950177
Location (UCSC)	Chr 11: 72.84 – 73.14 Mb	Chr 7: 100.74 – 100.93 Mb
PubMed search
- Wikidata
View/Edit Human	View/Edit Mouse

FCH and double SH3 domains protein 2 is a protein that in humans is encoded by the FCHSD2 gene.

== Interactions ==
FCHSD2 has been shown to interact with MAGI1 and CIMIP6.
