= MAGI1 =

Protein-coding gene in the species Homo sapiens

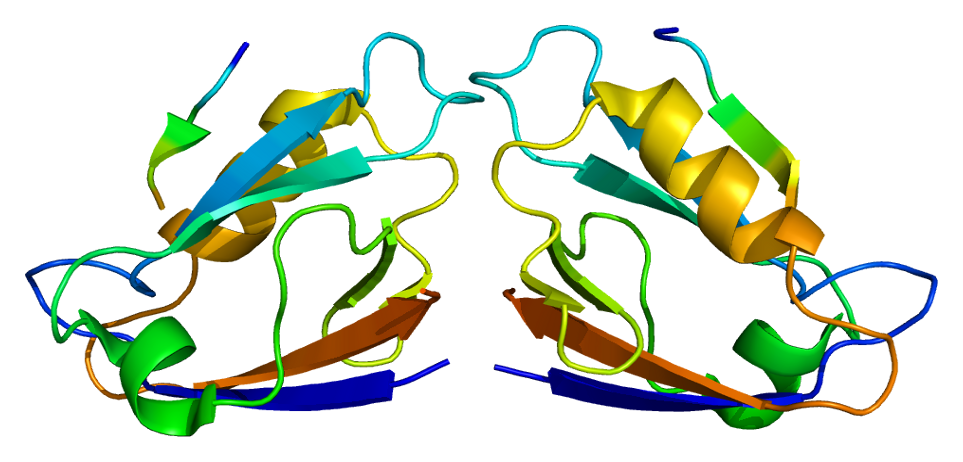

Identifiers
- Aliases: MAGI1, AIP-3, AIP3, BAIAP1, BAP-1, BAP1, MAGI-1, Magi1d, TNRC19, WWP3, membrane associated guanylate kinase, WW and PDZ domain containing 1, MAGI-1b
- External IDs: OMIM: 602625; MGI: 1203522; GeneCards: MAGI1
Available structures
PDB	Ortholog search: PDBe RCSB
PDB	List of PDB id codes 1WBP, 2KPK, 2KPL, 2Q9V, 2R4H, 2YSD, 2YSE, 2ZAJ, 3BPU

Gene location (Human)
Chr.	Chromosome 3 (human)
Band	3p14.1	Start	65,353,525 bp
Band	3p14.1	End	66,038,918 bp

Gene location (Mouse)
Chr.	Chromosome 6 (mouse)
Band	6|6 D1	Start	93,652,436 bp
Band	6|6 D1	End	94,260,898 bp
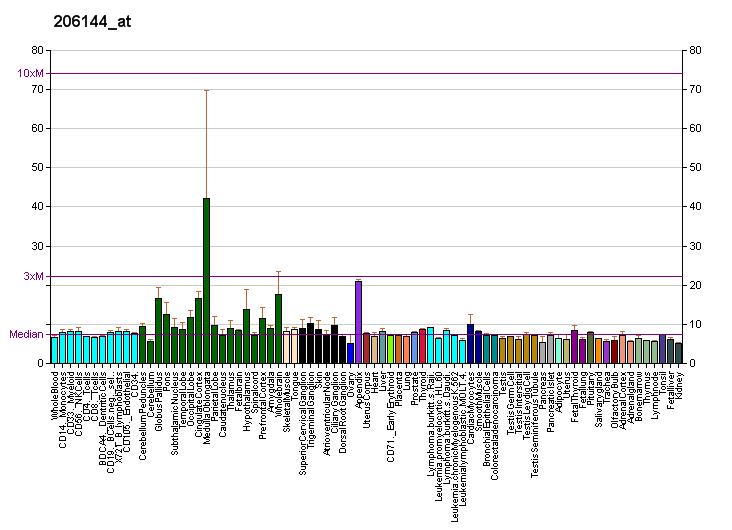
RNA expression pattern
Bgee	Human / Mouse (ortholog); Top expressed in: ventricular zone; sural nerve; corpus callosum; ganglionic eminence; Achilles tendon; superior frontal gyrus; cerebellum; cerebellar cortex; prefrontal cortex; cerebellar hemisphere / Top expressed in: ventricular zone; otic vesicle; ventromedial nucleus; zygote; lateral hypothalamus; genital tubercle; ventral tegmental area; saccule; lumbar spinal ganglion; inferior colliculi; More reference expression data
BioGPS	More reference expression data
Gene ontology
Molecular function	molecular adaptor activity; nucleotide binding; protein C-terminus binding; protein binding; ATP binding; alpha-actinin binding
Cellular component	adherens junction; cell junction; plasma membrane; cell projection; membrane; cell-cell junction; nucleoplasm; bicellular tight junction; nucleus; cytoplasm
Biological process	neuron death; cell surface receptor signaling pathway; cell adhesion; protein-containing complex assembly; signal transduction
Sources:Amigo / QuickGO
Orthologs
Databases	NCBI: entry; OMA: entry
Species	Human	Mouse
Entrez	9223	14924
Ensembl	ENSG00000282956; ENSG00000151276	ENSMUSG00000045095
UniProt	Q96QZ7	Q6RHR9
RefSeq (mRNA)	NM_001033057; NM_004742; NM_015520; NM_001365903; NM_001365904 NM_001365905	NM_001029850; NM_001083320; NM_001083321; NM_001286784; NM_001286785 NM_001286786; NM_001286788; NM_010367
RefSeq (protein)	NP_001028229; NP_004733; NP_056335; NP_001352832; NP_001352833 NP_001352834	NP_001025021; NP_001076789; NP_001076790; NP_001273713; NP_001273714 NP_001273715; NP_001273717; NP_034497
Location (UCSC)	Chr 3: 65.35 – 66.04 Mb	Chr 6: 93.65 – 94.26 Mb
PubMed search
- Wikidata
View/Edit Human	View/Edit Mouse

Membrane-associated guanylate kinase, WW and PDZ domain-containing protein 1 is an enzyme that in humans is encoded by the MAGI1 gene.

== Function ==
The protein encoded by this gene is a member of the membrane-associated guanylate kinase homologue (MAGUK) family. MAGUK proteins participate in the assembly of multiprotein complexes on the inner surface of the plasma membrane at regions of cell–cell contact. The product of this gene may play a role as scaffolding protein at cell–cell junctions. Alternatively spliced transcript variants encoding different isoforms have been identified.

== Interactions ==
MAGI1 has been shown to interact with:

- ACCN3,
- ATN1,
- Actinin alpha 4,
- Beta-catenin,
- Brain-specific angiogenesis inhibitor 1,
- Calcium-activated potassium channel subunit alpha-1,
- FCHSD2,
- LRP2, and
- SYNPO.
