= Dendritic spine =

Small protrusion on a dendrite that receives input from a single axon

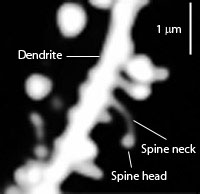
- Spiny dendrite of a striatal medium spiny neuron

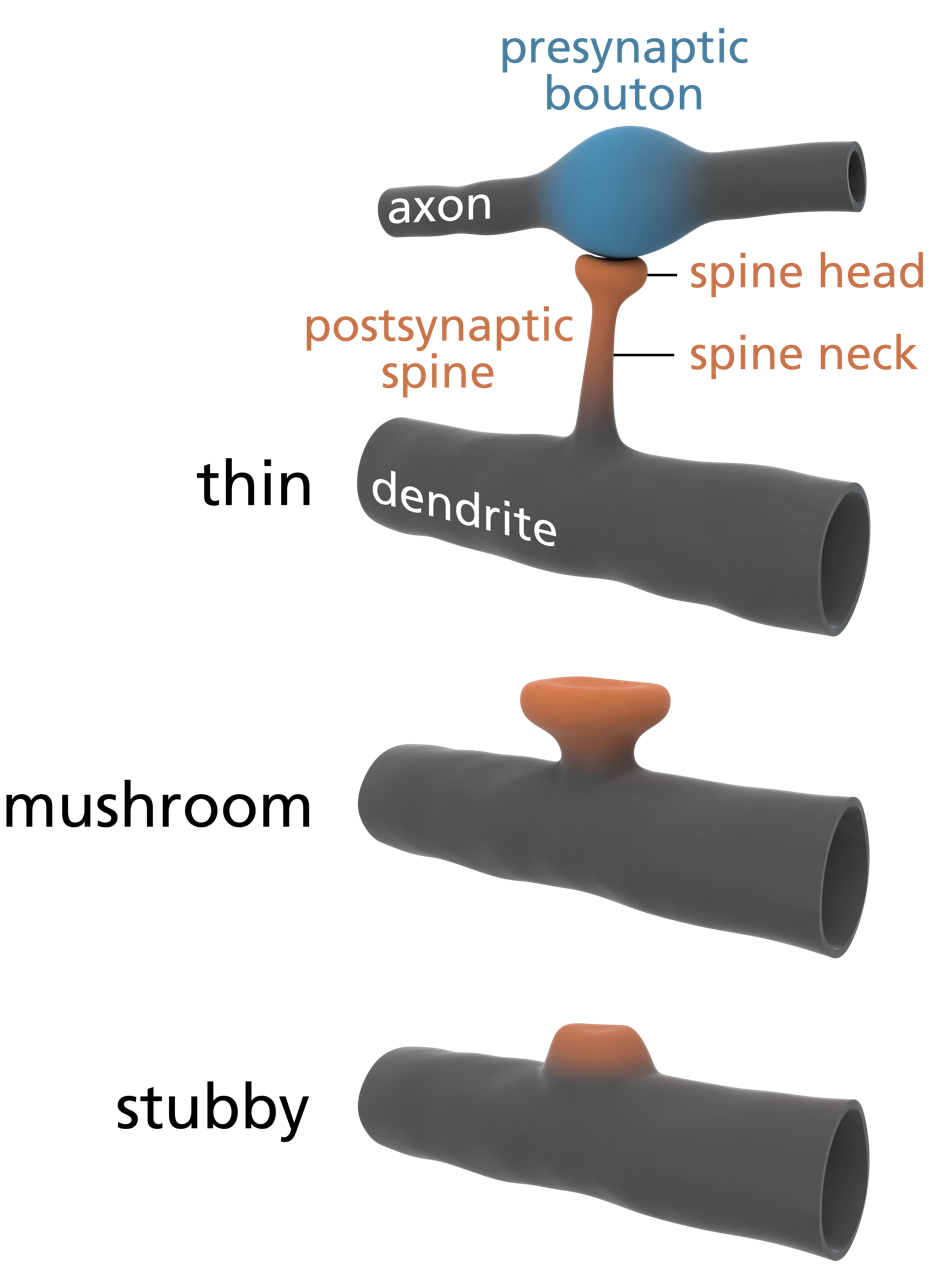
- Common types of dendritic spines

Details

Identifiers
- Latin: gemmula dendritica
- MeSH: D049229
- TH: H2.00.06.1.00036

A dendritic spine (or spine) is a small membrane protrusion from a neuron's dendrite that typically receives input from a single axon at the synapse. Dendritic spines serve as a storage site for synaptic strength and help transmit electrical signals to the neuron's cell body. Most spines have a bulbous head (the spine head), and a thin neck that connects the head of the spine to the shaft of the dendrite. The dendrites of a single neuron can contain hundreds to thousands of spines. In addition to spines providing an anatomical substrate for memory storage and synaptic transmission, they may also serve to increase the number of possible contacts between neurons. It has also been suggested that changes in the activity of neurons have a positive effect on spine morphology.

== Structure ==
Dendritic spines are small with spine head volumes ranging 0.01 μm^{3} to 0.8 μm^{3}. Spines with strong synaptic contacts typically have a large spine head, which connects to the dendrite via a membranous neck. The most notable classes of spine shape are "thin", "stubby", "mushroom", and "bifurcated". Electron microscopy studies have shown that there is a continuum of shapes between these categories. The variable spine shape and volume is thought to be correlated with the strength and maturity of each spine-synapse.

=== Distribution ===
Dendritic spines usually receive excitatory input from axons, although sometimes both inhibitory and excitatory connections are made onto the same spine head. Excitatory axon proximity to dendritic spines is not sufficient to predict the presence of a synapse, as demonstrated by the Lichtman lab in 2015.

Spines are found on the dendrites of most principal neurons in the brain, including the pyramidal neurons of the neocortex, the medium spiny neurons of the striatum, and the Purkinje cells of the cerebellum. Dendritic spines occur at a density of up to 5 spines/1 μm stretch of dendrite. Hippocampal and cortical pyramidal neurons may receive tens of thousands of mostly excitatory inputs from other neurons onto their equally numerous spines, whereas the number of spines on Purkinje neuron dendrites is an order of magnitude larger.

=== Cytoskeleton and organelles ===
The cytoskeleton of dendritic spines is particularly important in their synaptic plasticity; without a dynamic cytoskeleton, spines would be unable to rapidly change their volumes or shapes in responses to stimuli. These changes in shape might affect the electrical properties of the spine. The cytoskeleton of dendritic spines is primarily made of filamentous actin (F-actin). tubulin Monomers and microtubule-associated proteins (MAPs) are present, and organized microtubules are present. Because spines have a cytoskeleton of primarily actin, this allows them to be highly dynamic in shape and size. The actin cytoskeleton directly determines the morphology of the spine, and actin regulators, small GTPases such as Rac, RhoA, and CDC42, rapidly modify this cytoskeleton. Overactive Rac1 results in consistently smaller dendritic spines.

In addition to their electrophysiological activity and their receptor-mediated activity, spines appear to be vesicularly active and may even translate proteins. Stacked discs of the smooth endoplasmic reticulum (SERs) have been identified in dendritic spines. Formation of this "spine apparatus" depends on the protein synaptopodin and is believed to play an important role in calcium handling. "Smooth" vesicles have also been identified in spines, supporting the vesicular activity in dendritic spines. The presence of polyribosomes in spines also suggests protein translational activity in the spine itself, not just in the dendrite.

== Morphogenesis ==
The morphogenesis of dendritic spines is critical to the induction of long-term potentiation (LTP). The morphology of the spine depends on the states of actin, either in globular (G-actin) or filamentous (F-actin) forms. The role of Rho family of GTPases and its effects in the stability of actin and spine motility has important implications for memory. If the dendritic spine is the basic unit of information storage, then the spine's ability to extend and retract spontaneously must be constrained. If not, information may be lost. Rho family of GTPases makes significant contributions to the process that stimulates actin polymerization, which in turn increases the size and shape of the spine. Large spines are more stable than smaller ones and may be resistant to modification by additional synaptic activity. Because changes in the shape and size of dendritic spines are correlated with the strength of excitatory synaptic connections and heavily depend on remodeling of its underlying actin cytoskeleton, the specific mechanisms of actin regulation, and therefore the Rho family of GTPases, are integral to the formation, maturation, and plasticity of dendritic spines and to learning and memory.

=== RhoA pathway ===
One of the major Rho GTPases involved in spine morphogenesis is RhoA, a protein that also modulates the regulation and timing of cell division. In the context of activity in neurons, RhoA is activated in the following manner: once calcium has entered a cell through NMDA receptors, it binds to calmodulin and activates CaMKII, which leads to the activation of RhoA. The activation of the RhoA protein will activate ROCK, a RhoA kinase, which leads to the stimulation of LIM kinase, which in turn inhibits the protein cofilin. Cofilin's function is to reorganize the actin cytoskeleton of a cell; namely, it depolymerizes actin segments and thus inhibits the growth of growth cones and the repair of axons.

A study conducted by Murakoshi et al. in 2011 implicated the Rho GTPases RhoA and Cdc42 in dendritic spine morphogenesis. Both GTPases were quickly activated in single dendritic spines of pyramidal neurons in the CA1 region of the rat hippocampus during structural plasticity brought on by long-term potentiation stimuli. Concurrent RhoA and Cdc42 activation led to a transient increase in spine growth of up to 300% for five minutes, which decayed into a smaller but sustained growth for thirty minutes. The activation of RhoA diffused around the vicinity of the spine undergoing stimulation, and it was determined that RhoA is necessary for the transient phase and most likely the sustained phase as well of spine growth.

=== Cdc42 pathway ===
Cdc42 has been implicated in many different functions including dendritic growth, branching, and branch stability. Calcium influx into the cell through NMDA receptors binds to calmodulin and activates the Ca2+/calmodulin-dependent protein kinases II (CaMKII). In turn, CaMKII is activated and this activates Cdc42, after which no feedback signaling occurs upstream to calcium and CaMKII. If tagged with monomeric-enhanced green fluorescent protein, one can see that the activation of Cdc42 is limited to just the stimulated spine of a dendrite. This is because the molecule is continuously activated during plasticity and immediately inactivates after diffusing out of the spine. Despite its compartmentalized activity, Cdc42 is still mobile out of the stimulated spine, just like RhoA. Cdc42 activates PAK, which is a protein kinase that specifically phosphorylates and, therefore, inactivates ADF/cofilin. Inactivation of cofilin leads to increased actin polymerization and expansion of the spine's volume. Activation of Cdc42 is required for this increase in spinal volume to be sustained.

=== Observed changes in structural plasticity ===
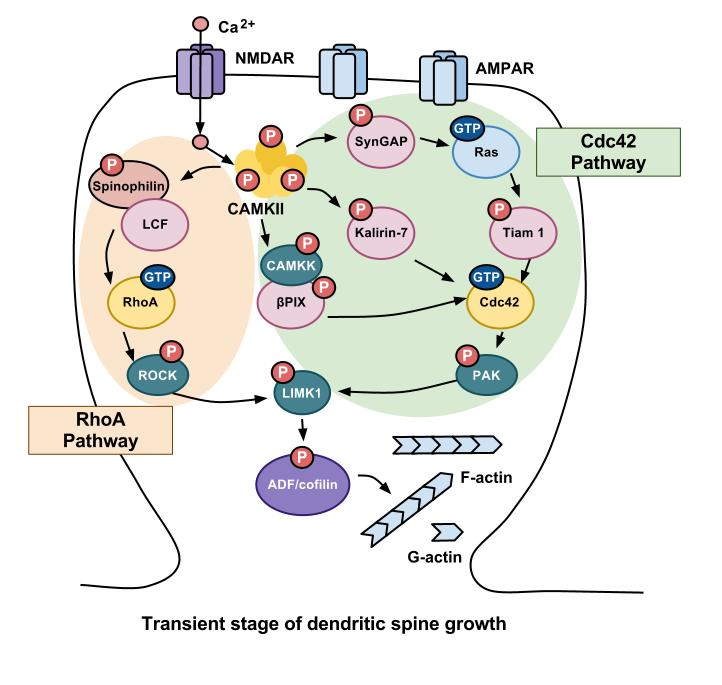
Calcium influx through NMDA receptors activates CAMKII. CAMKII then regulates several other signaling cascades that modulate the activity of the actin-binding proteins cofilin and profilin. These cascades can be divided into two primary pathways, the RhoA and Cdc42 pathways, which are mediated primarily by these members of the Rho family of GTPases. In the transient stage, the signaling cascade caused by synaptic activity results in LIMK1 phosphorylating ADF/cofilin via both the RhoA and Cdc42 pathways, which in turn inhibits the depolymerization of F-actin and increases the volume of the dendritic spine drastically while also inducing LTP.

Murakoshi, Wang, and Yasuda (2011) examined the effects of Rho GTPase activation on the structural plasticity of single dendritic spines elucidating differences between the transient and sustained phases.

==== Transient changes in structural plasticity ====
Applying a low-frequency train of two-photon glutamate uncaging in a single dendritic spine can elicit rapid activation of both RhoA and Cdc42. During the next two minutes, the volume of the stimulated spine can expand to 300 percent of its original size. However, this change in spine morphology is only temporary; the volume of the spine decreases after five minutes. Administration of C3 transferase, a Rho inhibitor, or glycyl-H1152, a Rock inhibitor, inhibits the transient expansion of the spine, indicating that activation of the Rho-Rock pathway is required in some way for this process.

==== Sustained changes in structural plasticity ====
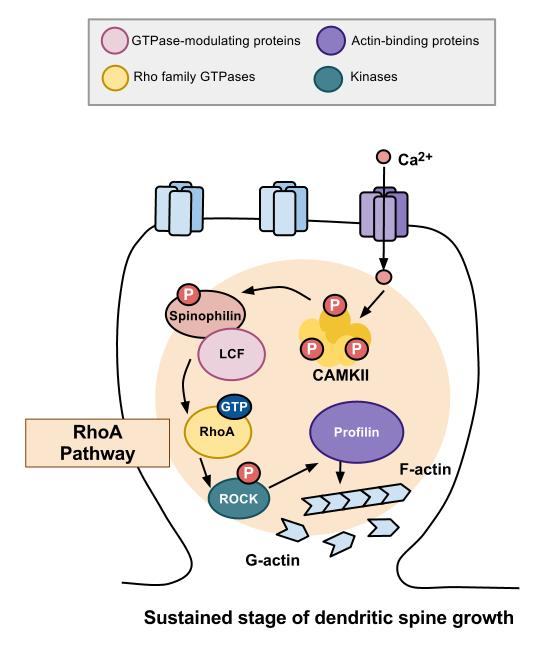
In contrast, the sustained stage is focused more on activating the RhoA pathway, which ultimately results in a higher concentration of profilin, which prevents additional polymerization of actin and decreases the size of the dendritic spine from the transient stage, though still allows it to remain at an elevated level compared to an unpotentiated spine.

After the transient changes described above take place, the spine's volume decreases until it is elevated by 70 to 80 percent of the original volume. This sustained change in structural plasticity will last about thirty minutes. Once again, administration of C3 transferase and Glycyl-H1152 suppressed this growth, suggesting that the Rho-Rock pathway is necessary for more persistent increases in spinal volume. In addition, administration of the Cdc42 binding domain of Wasp or inhibitor targeting Pak1 activation-3 (IPA3) decreases this sustained growth in volume, demonstrating that the Cdc42-Pak pathway is needed for this growth in spinal volume as well. This is important because sustained changes in structural plasticity may provide a mechanism for the encoding, maintenance, and retrieval of memories. The observations made may suggest that Rho GTPases are necessary for these processes.

== Physiology ==
=== Receptor activity ===
Dendritic spines express glutamate receptors (e.g. AMPA receptor and NMDA receptor) on their surface. The TrkB receptor for BDNF is also expressed on the spine surface, and is believed to play a role in spine survival. The tip of the spine contains an electron-dense region referred to as the "postsynaptic density" (PSD). The PSD directly apposes the active zone of its synapsing axon and comprises ~10% of the spine's membrane surface area; neurotransmitters released from the active zone bind receptors in the postsynaptic density of the spine. Half of the synapsing axons and dendritic spines are physically tethered by calcium-dependent cadherin, which forms cell-to-cell adherent junctions between two neurons.

Glutamate receptors (GluRs) are localized to the postsynaptic density, and are anchored by cytoskeletal elements to the membrane. They are positioned directly above their signalling machinery, which is typically tethered to the underside of the plasma membrane, allowing signals transmitted by the GluRs into the cytosol to be further propagated by their nearby signalling elements to activate signal transduction cascades. The localization of signalling elements to their GluRs is particularly important in ensuring signal cascade activation, as GluRs would be unable to affect particular downstream effects without nearby signallers.

Signalling from GluRs is mediated by the presence of an abundance of proteins, especially kinases, that are localized to the postsynaptic density. These include calcium-dependent calmodulin, CaMKII (calmodulin-dependent protein kinase II), PKC (Protein Kinase C), PKA (Protein Kinase A), Protein Phosphatase-1 (PP-1), and Fyn tyrosine kinase. Certain signallers, such as CaMKII, are upregulated in response to activity.

Spines are particularly advantageous to neurons by compartmentalizing biochemical signals. This can help to encode changes in the state of an individual synapse without necessarily affecting the state of other synapses of the same neuron. The length and width of the spine neck has a large effect on the degree of compartmentalization, with thin spines being the most biochemically isolated spines.

=== Plasticity ===
Dendritic spines are very "plastic", that is, spines change significantly in shape, volume, and number in small time courses. Because spines have a primarily actin cytoskeleton, they are dynamic, and the majority of spines change their shape within seconds to minutes because of the dynamicity of actin remodeling. Furthermore, spine number is very variable and spines come and go; in a matter of hours, 10-20% of spines can spontaneously appear or disappear on the pyramidal cells of the cerebral cortex, although the larger "mushroom"-shaped spines are the most stable.

Spine maintenance and plasticity is activity-dependent and activity-independent. BDNF partially determines spine levels, and low levels of AMPA receptor activity is necessary to maintain spine survival, and synaptic activity involving NMDA receptors encourages spine growth. Furthermore, two-photon laser scanning microscopy and confocal microscopy have shown that spine volume changes depending on the types of stimuli that are presented to a synapse.

=== Importance to learning and memory ===
==== Evidence of importance ====
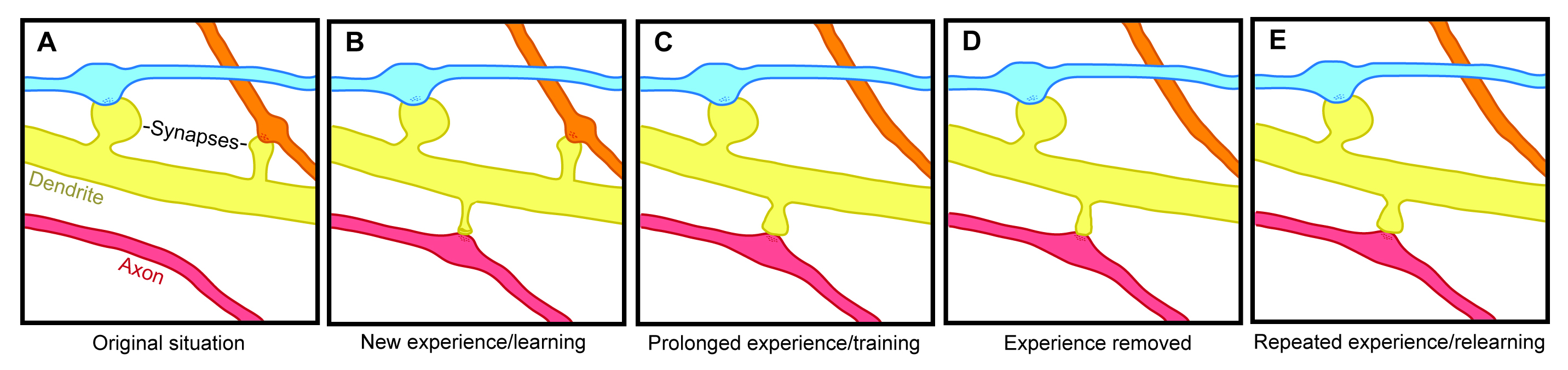
Experience-dependent spine formation and elimination

Spine plasticity is implicated in motivation, learning, and memory. In particular, long-term memory is mediated in part by the growth of new dendritic spines (or the enlargement of pre-existing spines) to reinforce a particular neural pathway. Because dendritic spines are plastic structures whose lifespan is influenced by input activity, spine dynamics may play an important role in the maintenance of memory over a lifetime.

Age-dependent changes in the rate of spine turnover suggest that spine stability impacts developmental learning. In youth, dendritic spine turnover is relatively high and produces a net loss of spines. This high rate of spine turnover may characterize critical periods of development and reflect learning capacity in adolescence—different cortical areas exhibit differing levels of synaptic turnover during development, possibly reflecting varying critical periods for specific brain regions. In adulthood, however, most spines remain persistent, and the half-life of spines increases. This stabilization occurs due to a developmentally regulated slow-down of spine elimination, a process which may underlie the stabilization of memories in maturity.

Experience-induced changes in dendritic spine stability also point to spine turnover as a mechanism involved in the maintenance of long-term memories, though it is unclear how sensory experience affects neural circuitry. Two general models might describe the impact of experience on structural plasticity. On the one hand, experience and activity may drive the discrete formation of relevant synaptic connections that store meaningful information in order to allow for learning. On the other hand, synaptic connections may be formed in excess, and experience and activity may lead to the pruning of extraneous synaptic connections.

In lab animals of all ages, environmental enrichment has been related to dendritic branching, spine density, and overall number of synapses. In addition, skill training has been shown to lead to the formation and stabilization of new spines while destabilizing old spines, suggesting that the learning of a new skill involves a rewiring process of neural circuits. Since the extent of spine remodeling correlates with success of learning, this suggests a crucial role of synaptic structural plasticity in memory formation. In addition, changes in spine stability and strengthening occur rapidly and have been observed within hours after training.

Conversely, while enrichment and training are related to increases in spine formation and stability, long-term sensory deprivation leads to an increase in the rate of spine elimination and therefore impacts long-term neural circuitry. Upon restoring sensory experience after deprivation in adolescence, spine elimination is accelerated, suggesting that experience plays an important role in the net loss of spines during development. In addition, other sensory deprivation paradigms—such as whisker trimming—have been shown to increase the stability of new spines.

Research in neurological diseases and injuries shed further light on the nature and importance of spine turnover. After stroke, a marked increase in structural plasticity occurs near the trauma site, and a five- to eightfold increase from control rates in spine turnover has been observed. Dendrites disintegrate and reassemble rapidly during ischemia—as with stroke, survivors showed an increase in dendritic spine turnover. While a net loss of spines is observed in Alzheimer's disease and cases of intellectual disability, cocaine and amphetamine use have been linked to increases in dendritic branching and spine density in the prefrontal cortex and the nucleus accumbens. Because significant changes in spine density occur in various brain and spinal cord diseases, this suggests a balanced state of spine dynamics in normal circumstances, which may be susceptible to disequilibrium under varying pathological conditions.

There is also some evidence for loss of dendritic spines as a consequence of aging. One study using mice has noted a correlation between age-related reductions in spine densities in the hippocampus and age-dependent declines in hippocampal learning and memory. Emerging evidence has also shown dendritic spine abnormalities in the pain processing regions of the spinal cord nociceptive system, including superficial and intermediate zones of the dorsal horn.

Overall, the evidence suggests that dendritic spines are crucial for normal brain and spinal cord function. Alterations in spine morphology may not only influence synaptic plasticity and information processing but also have a key role in many neurological diseases. Furthermore, even subtle changes in dendritic spine densities or sizes can affect neuronal network properties, which could lead to cognitive or mood alterations, impaired learning and memory, as well as pain hypersensitivity. Moreover, the findings suggest that maintaining spine health through therapies such as exercise, cognitive stimulation and lifestyle modifications may be helpful in preserving neuronal plasticity and improving neurological symptoms.

==== Importance contested ====
Despite experimental findings that suggest a role for dendritic spine dynamics in mediating learning and memory, the degree of structural plasticity's importance remains debatable. For instance, studies estimate that only a small portion of spines formed during training actually contribute to lifelong learning. In addition, the formation of new spines may not significantly contribute to the connectivity of the brain, and spine formation may not bear as much of an influence on memory retention as other properties of structural plasticity, such as the increase in size of spine heads.

== Modeling ==
Theoreticians have for decades hypothesized about the potential electrical function of spines, yet our inability to examine their electrical properties has until recently stopped theoretical work from progressing too far. Recent advances in imaging techniques along with increased use of two-photon glutamate uncaging have led to a wealth of new discoveries; we now suspect that there are voltage-dependent sodium, potassium, and calcium channels in the spine heads.

Cable theory provides the theoretical framework behind the most "simple" method for modelling the flow of electrical currents along passive neural fibres. Each spine can be treated as two compartments, one representing the neck, the other representing the spine head. The compartment representing the spine head alone should carry the active properties.

=== Baer and Rinzel's continuum model ===
To facilitate the analysis of interactions between many spines, Baer & Rinzel formulated a new cable theory for which the distribution of spines is treated as a continuum. In this representation, spine head voltage is the local spatial average of membrane potential in adjacent spines. The formulation maintains the feature that there is no direct electrical coupling between neighboring spines; voltage spread along dendrites is the only way for spines to interact.

=== Spike-diffuse-spike model ===
The SDS model was intended as a computationally simple version of the full Baer and Rinzel model. It was designed to be analytically tractable and have as few free parameters as possible while retaining those of greatest significance, such as spine neck resistance. The model drops the continuum approximation and instead uses a passive dendrite coupled to excitable spines at discrete points. Membrane dynamics in the spines are modelled using integrate and fire processes. The spike events are modelled in a discrete fashion with the wave form conventionally represented as a rectangular function.

=== Modeling spine calcium transients ===
Calcium transients in spines are a key trigger for synaptic plasticity. NMDA receptors, which have a high permeability for calcium, only conduct ions if the membrane potential is sufficiently depolarized. The amount of calcium entering a spine during synaptic activity therefore depends on the depolarization of the spine head. Evidence from calcium imaging experiments (two-photon microscopy) and from compartmental modelling indicates that spines with high resistance necks experience larger calcium transients during synaptic activity.

== Development ==
Dendritic spines can develop directly from dendritic shafts or from dendritic filopodia. During synaptogenesis, dendrites rapidly sprout and retract filopodia, small membrane organelle-lacking membranous protrusions. Recently, I-BAR protein MIM was found to contribute to the initiation process. During the first week from birth, the brain is predominated by filopodia, which eventually develop synapses. However, after this first week, filopodia are replaced by spiny dendrites but also small, stubby spines that protrude from spiny dendrites. In the development of certain filopodia into spines, filopodia recruit presynaptic contact to the dendrite, which encourages the production of spines to handle specialized postsynaptic contact with the presynaptic protrusions.

Spines, however, require maturation after formation. Immature spines have impaired signaling capabilities, and typically lack "heads" (or have very small heads), only necks, while matured spines maintain both heads and necks.

== Clinical significance ==
Emerging research has indicate abnormalities in spine density in anxiety disorders.

Cognitive disorders such as ADHD, Alzheimer's disease, autism, intellectual disability, and fragile X syndrome, may be resultant from abnormalities in dendritic spines, especially the number of spines and their maturity. The ratio of matured to immature spines is important in their signaling, as immature spines have impaired synaptic signaling. Fragile X syndrome is characterized by an overabundance of immature spines that have multiple filopodia in cortical dendrites.

== History ==
Dendritic spines were first described at the end of the 19th century by Santiago Ramón y Cajal on cerebellar neurons. Ramón y Cajal then proposed that dendritic spines could serve as contacting sites between neurons. This was demonstrated more than 50 years later thanks to the emergence of electron microscopy. Until the development of confocal microscopy on living tissues, it was commonly admitted that spines were formed during embryonic development and then would remain stable after birth. In this paradigm, variations of synaptic weight were considered as sufficient to explain memory processes at the cellular level. But since about a decade ago, new techniques of confocal microscopy demonstrated that dendritic spines are indeed motile and dynamic structures that undergo a constant turnover, even after birth.
