= Acylphosphatase-1 =

Enzyme found in humans

ACYP1
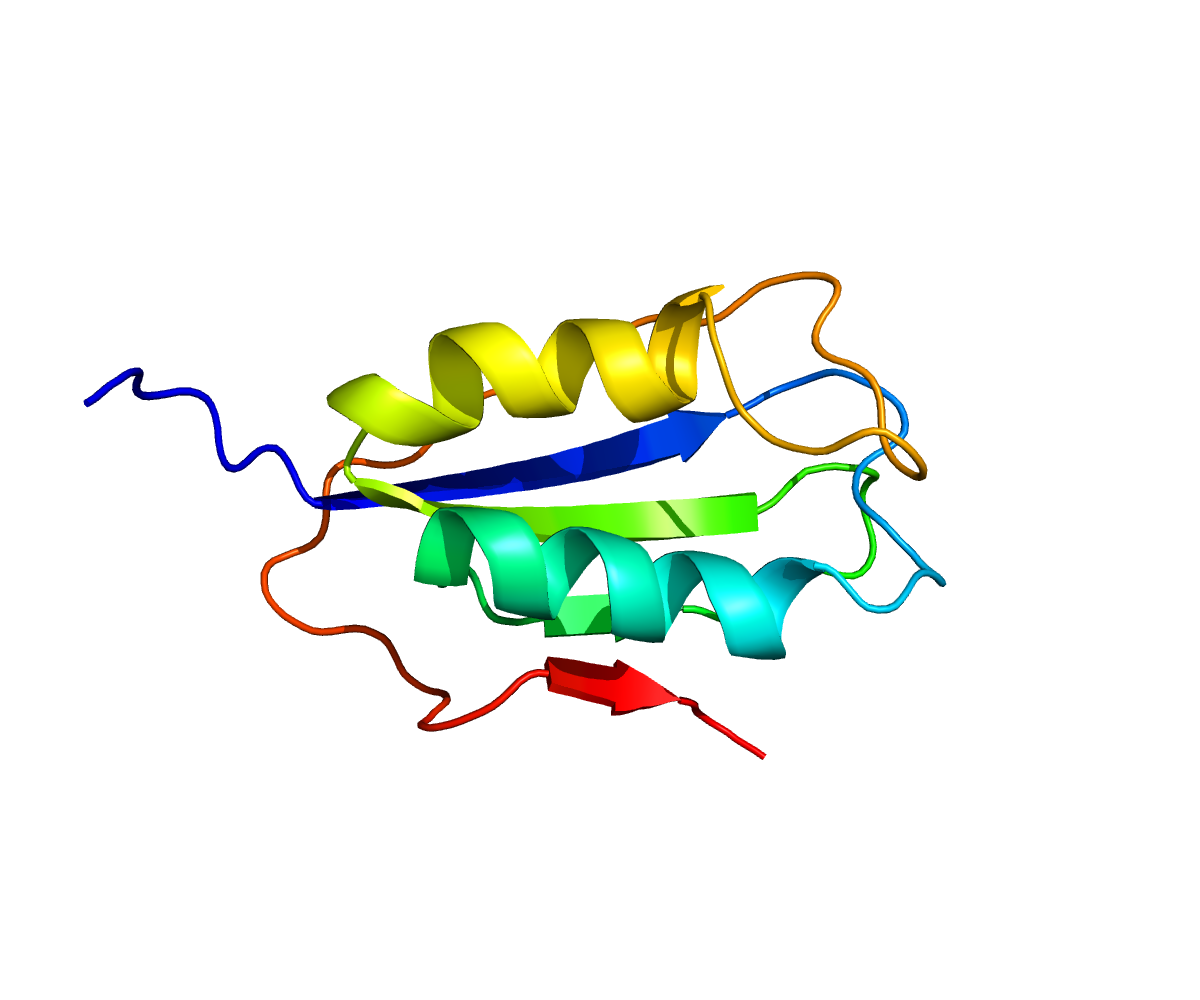

Identifiers
- Aliases: ACYP1, ACYPE, acylphosphatase 1
- External IDs: OMIM: 600875; MGI: 1913454; GeneCards: ACYP1
Available structures
PDB	Ortholog search: PDBe RCSB
PDB	List of PDB id codes 2K7J, 2K7K, 2VH7, 2W4C, 2W4P, 3TOQ
Enzyme activity
EC #	BRENDA	ExPASy	KEGG	MetaCyc
3.6.1.7	↗	↗	↗	↗

Gene location (Human)
Chr.	Chromosome 14 (human)
Band	14q24.3	Start	75,053,237 bp
Band	14q24.3	End	75,069,483 bp

Gene location (Mouse)
Chr.	Chromosome 12 (mouse)
Band	12|12 D1	Start	85,319,172 bp
Band	12|12 D1	End	85,335,212 bp
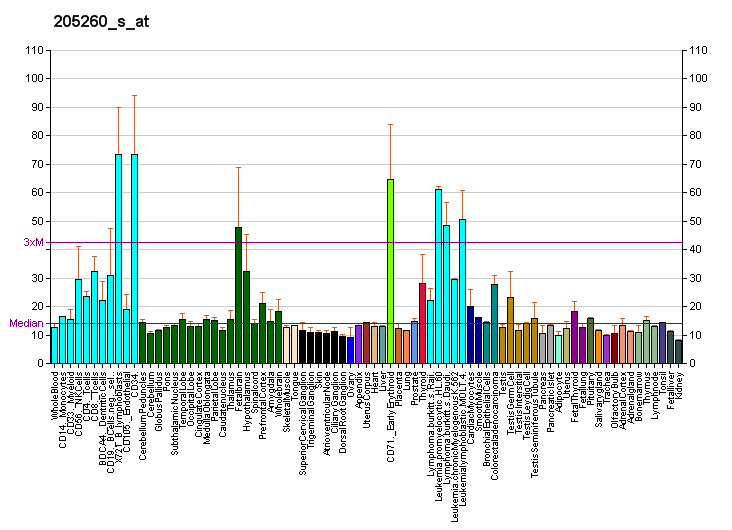
RNA expression pattern
Bgee	Human / Mouse (ortholog); Top expressed in: right uterine tube; right lung; ventricular zone; ganglionic eminence; pituitary gland; middle temporal gyrus; anterior pituitary; Brodmann area 9; right lobe of thyroid gland; C1 segment / Top expressed in: seminiferous tubule; spermatocyte; spermatid; facial motor nucleus; choroid plexus of fourth ventricle; intercostal muscle; lobe of cerebellum; deep cerebellar nuclei; cerebellar vermis; medulla oblongata; More reference expression data
BioGPS	More reference expression data
Gene ontology
Molecular function	hydrolase activity; acylphosphatase activity
Cellular component	extracellular exosome
Biological process	phosphate-containing compound metabolic process
Sources:Amigo / QuickGO
Orthologs
Databases	NCBI: entry; OMA: entry
Species	Human	Mouse
Entrez	97	66204
Ensembl	ENSG00000119640	ENSMUSG00000008822
UniProt	P07311	P56376
RefSeq (mRNA)	NM_001107; NM_001302616; NM_001302617; NM_203488	NM_025421; NM_001364360; NM_001364361
RefSeq (protein)	NP_001098; NP_001289545; NP_001289546	NP_079697; NP_001351289; NP_001351290
Location (UCSC)	Chr 14: 75.05 – 75.07 Mb	Chr 12: 85.32 – 85.34 Mb
PubMed search
- Wikidata
View/Edit Human	View/Edit Mouse

Acylphosphatase-1 is an enzyme that in humans is encoded by the ACYP1 gene.

== Function ==
Acylphosphatase is a small cytosolic enzyme that catalyzes the hydrolysis of the carboxyl-phosphate bond of acylphosphates. Two isoenzymes have been isolated, called muscle acylphosphatase and erythrocyte acylphosphatase, on the basis of their tissue localization. This gene encodes the erythrocyte acylphosphatase isoenzyme. Alternatively spliced transcript variants that encode different proteins were identified through data analysis.
