= Dendritic filopodia =

Dendritic filopodia are small, membranous protrusions found primarily on dendritic stretches of developing neurons. These structures may receive synaptic input, and can develop into dendritic spines. Dendritic filopodia are generally less-well studied than dendritic spines because their transient nature makes them difficult to detect with traditional microscopy techniques. Sample preparation can also destroy dendritic filopodia. However, it has been determined that filopodia on dendritic shafts are distinct from other types of filopodia (even those found in dendritic growth cones) and may react to stimuli in different ways.

== Structure ==
Dendritic filopodia are thin and hairlike. They are defined as having a length that is at least twice the width, and they do not display the bulbous head found on dendritic spines. Filopodia are devoid of most cellular organelles, and are composed primarily of actin cytoskeletal elements. Synaptic contacts may occur along the length of the filopodia, not only at the end.

== Role in Synaptic Transmission ==
Dendritic filopodia may be the site of synapses in certain regions of the nervous system. In some neuronal cell types, such as in rat retinal ganglion cells, dendritic spines are not present, suggesting that in these cases, synaptogenesis occurs primarily on dendritic shafts or on filopodia themselves. Filopodia may synapse with neighboring axons both along the length of the filopodium and at the tip. Synaptic activity on dendritic filopodia may alter their morphology, or induce their transformation into dendritic spines (see transformation into spines.)

== Role in Development ==
In the early stages of neural development, dendritic shafts are overwhelmingly populated by dendritic filopodia. Gradually, the number of filopodia begin to decline concordant with a rise in spine number. Eventually, spines become the dominant structure on dendritic shafts with only a few filopodia present. Filopodia seem to grow in response to localized pulses of glutamate, suggesting that they may play a role in directing dendritic branching.

=== Transformation into Spines ===
Dendritic filopodia can be readily observed transforming into dendritic spines. It has been proposed that filopodia may represent the precursors to dendritic spines and that their transience and motility may allow for selection of synaptic partners. Selection of synaptic partners may be dependent on detected synaptic activity in the vicinity of the filopodium. Localized glutamate signaling in the area of dendritic filopodia causes an increase in filopodial length, whereas blocking glutamate receptors reduces numbers of dendritic filopodia. Therefore, dendritic filopodia may be used by post-synaptic cells to detect passing axons. After contact between dendritic filopodium and a neighboring axon has been established, the filopodium retracts and the head begins to swell, taking on a more spine-like morphology. At this stage, the synapse is considered to be matured, and is perceived as more stable.

Although dendritic filopodia have been observed becoming dendritic spines, the process through which this occurs is unknown. Studies have reported that filopodia may undergo more than one stage of development before becoming spines, and that clustering of certain proteins such as Drebrin may be used to identify the maturity of filopodia. Mature spines contain enrichments of PSD95 protein at their spine heads, and PSD95 is often used as an indicator of spine maturity. However, dendritic filopodia can take on spine-like morphologies even without post-synaptic density proteins, pointing to actin remodeling as the primary process responsible for the development of spines from filopodia. Cytoskeletal analyses of spines versus filopodia have found that a spine-like morphology is associated with higher numbers of branched actin filaments. Therefore, proteins that interact with the arp2/3 complex as well as F-actin are under investigation for involvement in this process. Because filopodia are also sensitive to local concentrations of glutamate, proteins that interact with NMDA receptors in dendritic filopodia are also candidates for regulation of this process.

== Role in Synaptic Plasticity ==
Studies have shown that on mature dendritic stretches, NMDAR-mediated synaptic activity can spur the outgrowth of new filopodia, which can later develop into mature spine synapses. This finding represents a possible role for dendritic filopodia in synaptic plasticity because filopodia may serve as precursors to mature synapses even in mature neurons.

== Role in Disease ==
Although dendritic filopodia do not play a clear role in any particular disease, abnormally high numbers of filopodia have been found in the brains of patients with Autism spectrum disorders. This high-filopodia, low-spine phenotype may be due to failure of the filopodia to mature properly into spines. Mutations in the gene SHANK3 have been shown to elicit similar phenotypes to those seen in the brains of patients with these disorders.
