= Acylphosphatase-2 =

Enzyme found in humans

ACYP2
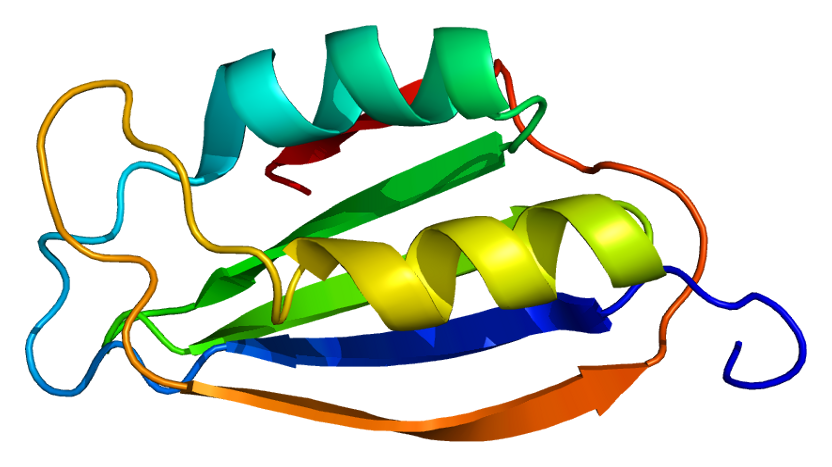

Identifiers
- Aliases: ACYP2, ACYM, ACYP, acylphosphatase 2
- External IDs: OMIM: 102595; MGI: 1922822; GeneCards: ACYP2
Enzyme activity
EC #	BRENDA	ExPASy	KEGG	MetaCyc
3.6.1.7	↗	↗	↗	↗

Gene location (Human)
Chr.	Chromosome 2 (human)
Band	2p16.2	Start	53,970,838 bp
Band	2p16.2	End	54,305,300 bp

Gene location (Mouse)
Chr.	Chromosome 11 (mouse)
Band	11|11 A4	Start	30,455,991 bp
Band	11|11 A4	End	30,599,587 bp
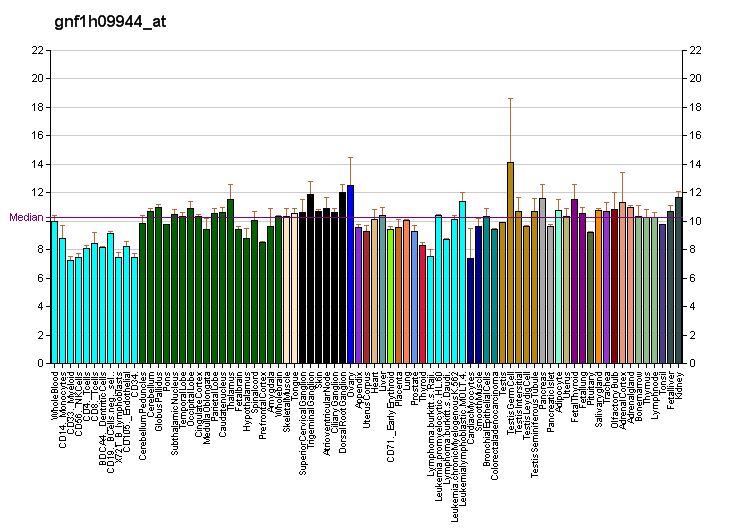
RNA expression pattern
Bgee	Human / Mouse (ortholog); Top expressed in: pons; biceps brachii; thoracic diaphragm; C1 segment; Skeletal muscle tissue of rectus abdominis; vastus lateralis muscle; muscle of thigh; body of tongue; gastrocnemius muscle; superior vestibular nucleus / Top expressed in: intercostal muscle; quadriceps femoris muscle; vastus lateralis muscle; masseter muscle; facial motor nucleus; tibialis anterior muscle; medial head of gastrocnemius muscle; triceps brachii muscle; digastric muscle; sternocleidomastoid muscle; More reference expression data
BioGPS	More reference expression data
Gene ontology
Molecular function	protein binding; hydrolase activity; acylphosphatase activity; identical protein binding
Cellular component	mitochondrion
Biological process	phosphate-containing compound metabolic process
Sources:Amigo / QuickGO
Orthologs
Databases	NCBI: entry; OMA: entry
Species	Human	Mouse
Entrez	98	75572
Ensembl	ENSG00000170634	ENSMUSG00000060923
UniProt	P14621	P56375
RefSeq (mRNA)	NM_138448; NM_001320586; NM_001320587; NM_001320588; NM_001320589 NM_001320590	NM_029344
RefSeq (protein)	NP_001307515; NP_001307516; NP_001307517; NP_001307518; NP_001307519 NP_612457	NP_083620
Location (UCSC)	Chr 2: 53.97 – 54.31 Mb	Chr 11: 30.46 – 30.6 Mb
PubMed search
- Wikidata
View/Edit Human	View/Edit Mouse

Acylphosphatase-2 is an enzyme that in humans is encoded by the ACYP2 gene.

== Function ==
Acylphosphatase can hydrolyze the phosphoenzyme intermediate of different membrane pumps, particularly the Ca2+/Mg2+-ATPase from sarcoplasmic reticulum of skeletal muscle. Two isoenzymes have been isolated, called muscle acylphosphatase and erythrocyte acylphosphatase on the basis of their tissue localization. This gene encodes the muscle-type isoform (MT). An increase of the MT isoform is associated with muscle differentiation.
