= SH3BP4 =

Protein-coding gene in the species Homo sapiens

Identifiers
- Aliases: SH3BP4, BOG25, TTP, SH3 domain binding protein 4
- External IDs: OMIM: 605611; MGI: 2138297; GeneCards: SH3BP4

Gene location (Human)
| Chr. | Chromosome 2 (human) |
| Band | 2q37.2 | Start | 234,952,017 bp |
| Band | 2q37.2 | End | 235,055,714 bp |

Gene location (Mouse)
| Chr. | Chromosome 1 (mouse) |
| Band | 1|1 D | Start | 88,998,137 bp |
| Band | 1|1 D | End | 89,082,790 bp |
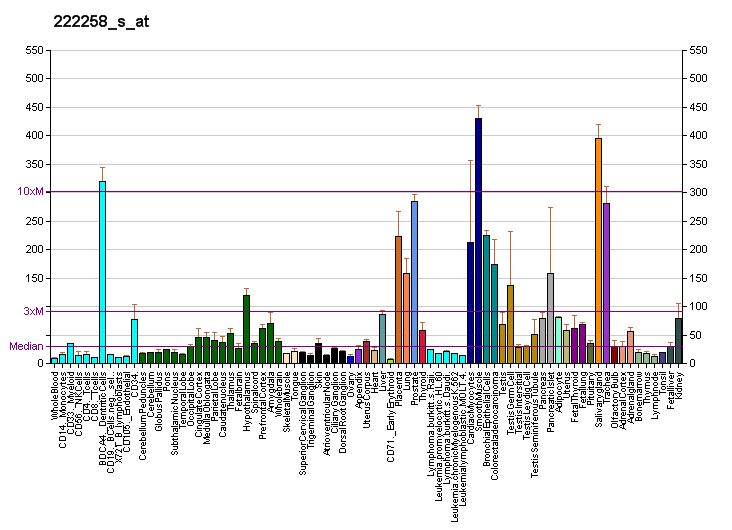
RNA expression pattern
| Bgee | Human / Mouse (ortholog); Top expressed in: parotid gland; trachea; mucosa of paranasal sinus; renal medulla; germinal epithelium; nasal epithelium; caput epididymis; Epithelium of choroid plexus; tibia; epithelium of lactiferous gland / Top expressed in: lacrimal gland; molar; parotid gland; maxillary prominence; seminal vesicula; mandibular prominence; ascending aorta; vestibular membrane of cochlear duct; somite; lumbar spinal ganglion; More reference expression data |
| BioGPS | More reference expression data |
Gene ontology
| Molecular function | protein binding; identical protein binding; GDP-dissociation inhibitor activity |
| Cellular component | cytoplasm; membrane; clathrin-coated pit; cytoplasmic vesicle; extracellular exosome; nucleus; clathrin-coated vesicle |
| Biological process | cellular response to amino acid stimulus; protein localization to lysosome; negative regulation of GTPase activity; regulation of catalytic activity; endocytosis; negative regulation of cell growth; positive regulation of autophagy; amino acid import; negative regulation of cell population proliferation; negative regulation of TOR signaling |
Sources:Amigo / QuickGO
Orthologs
| Databases | NCBI: entry; OMA: entry |
| Species | Human | Mouse |
| Entrez | 23677 | 98402 |
| Ensembl | ENSG00000130147 | ENSMUSG00000036206 |
| UniProt | Q9P0V3 | Q921I6 |
| RefSeq (mRNA) | NM_014521 | NM_133816 |
| RefSeq (protein) | NP_055336; NP_001358231; NP_001358232; NP_001358233; NP_001358234 NP_001358235 | NP_598577 |
| Location (UCSC) | Chr 2: 234.95 – 235.06 Mb | Chr 1: 89 – 89.08 Mb |
| PubMed search |
- Wikidata
| View/Edit Human | View/Edit Mouse |

SH3 domain-binding protein 4 is a protein that in humans is encoded by the SH3BP4 gene.

This gene encodes a protein with 3 Asn-Pro-Phe (NPF) motifs, an SH3 domain, a PXXP motif, a bipartite nuclear targeting signal, and a tyrosine phosphorylation site. This protein is involved in cargo-specific control of clathrin-mediated endocytosis, specifically controlling the internalization of a specific protein receptor.
