= SYNPO =

Mammalian protein found in Homo sapiens

Identifiers
- Aliases: SYNPO, synaptopodin
- External IDs: OMIM: 608155; MGI: 1099446; GeneCards: SYNPO

Gene location (Human)
Chr.	Chromosome 5 (human)
Band	5q33.1	Start	150,601,080 bp
Band	5q33.1	End	150,659,207 bp

Gene location (Mouse)
Chr.	Chromosome 18 (mouse)
Band	18|18 D3- E1	Start	60,727,045 bp
Band	18|18 D3- E1	End	60,793,214 bp
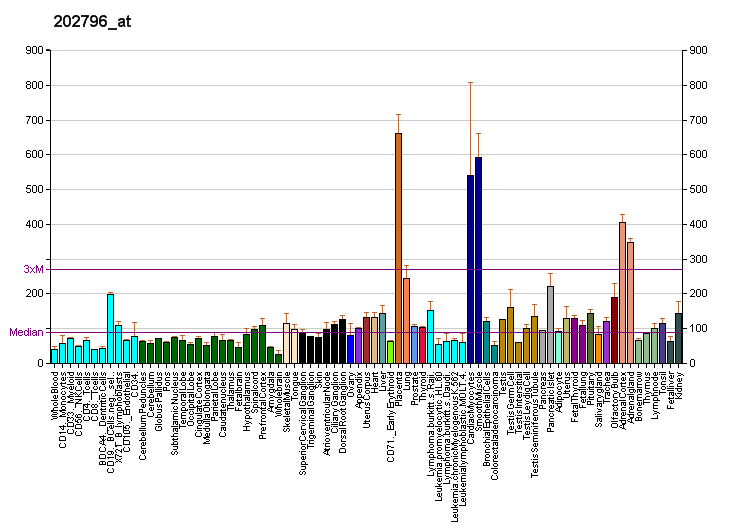
RNA expression pattern
Bgee	Human / Mouse (ortholog); Top expressed in: muscle of thigh; apex of heart; Descending thoracic aorta; gastrocnemius muscle; Skeletal muscle tissue of rectus abdominis; ascending aorta; right coronary artery; right auricle of heart; tendon of biceps brachii; left ventricle / Top expressed in: ascending aorta; aortic valve; muscle of thigh; external carotid artery; tunica media of zone of aorta; lumbar spinal ganglion; dentate gyrus of hippocampal formation granule cell; superior frontal gyrus; cumulus cell; ankle joint; More reference expression data
BioGPS	More reference expression data
Gene ontology
Molecular function	protein binding; actin binding
Cellular component	cytoplasm; perikaryon; cell junction; postsynaptic membrane; dendritic spine; plasma membrane; cell projection; synapse; cytoskeleton; membrane; postsynaptic density; bicellular tight junction; Z discdkac; nucleus; actin cytoskeleton; stress fiber; spine apparatus; Schaffer collateral - CA1 synapse; glutamatergic synapse
Biological process	positive regulation of actin filament bundle assembly; regulation of stress fiber assembly; spine apparatus assembly; visual learning; regulation of long-term neuronal synaptic plasticity; modification of dendritic spine; postsynaptic modulation of chemical synaptic transmission; positive regulation of postsynaptic cytosolic calcium concentration
Sources:Amigo / QuickGO
Orthologs
Databases	NCBI: entry; OMA: entry
Species	Human	Mouse
Entrez	11346	104027
Ensembl	ENSG00000171992	ENSMUSG00000043079
UniProt	Q8N3V7	Q8CC35
RefSeq (mRNA)	NM_001109974; NM_001166208; NM_001166209; NM_007286	NM_001109975; NM_177340
RefSeq (protein)	NP_001103444; NP_001159680; NP_001159681; NP_009217	NP_001103445; NP_796314
Location (UCSC)	Chr 5: 150.6 – 150.66 Mb	Chr 18: 60.73 – 60.79 Mb
PubMed search
- Wikidata
View/Edit Human	View/Edit Mouse

Synaptopodin is a protein that in humans is encoded by the SYNPO gene.

== Function ==
Synaptopodin is an actin-associated protein that may play a role in actin-based cell shape and motility. The name synaptopodin derives from the protein's associations with postsynaptic densities and dendritic spines and with renal podocytes (Mundel et al., 1997).[supplied by OMIM]

== Interactions ==
SYNPO has been shown to interact with MAGI1.
