= FEZ proteins =

FEZ Proteins

Identifiers
- Symbol: FEZ
- Pfam: PF07763
- InterPro: IPR011680
Available protein structures:
- PDB: IPR011680 PF07763 (ECOD; PDBsum)
- AlphaFold: IPR011680; PF07763

In molecular biology, the FEZ protein family is a family of eukaryotic proteins involved in axonal outgrowth and fasciculation. The symbol "FEZ" is short for fasciculation and elongation protein zeta/zygin. This family of adaptor proteins includes the UNC-76 homologs FEZ1 and FEZ2. FEZ proteins are implicated in intracellular transport, acting as bivalent cargo transport adaptors in kinesin-mediated movement.

The FEZ1 and FEZ2 homologs were discovered in 1997, a dozen years after the discovery of the UNC-76 gene in C. elegans. Functionally, this protein family is involved in several significant processes, such as neuronal development, viral infection, and autophagy. Both FEZ1 and FEZ2 play crucial roles in axonal outgrowth and fasciculation, where they act as vital signaling hubs and interact with PKC zeta. FEZ1 is found predominantly within the brain, with its highest expression levels reported in neurons. As a kinesin adaptor protein, FEZ1 has also been reported as a direct regulator of HIV-1 viral particle transport.

== See also ==
- FEZ1
- FEZ2
- Kinesin
