= Fez =

Fez most often refers to:

- Fez (hat), a type of felt hat commonly worn in the Ottoman Empire
- Fez, Morocco (or Fes), one of the largest cities of Morocco

Fez or FEZ may also refer to:

== Arts and media ==
- Fez (Frank Stella), a 1964 painting by the modern artist Frank Stella
- Fez (That '70s Show), a fictional character from the TV series That '70s Show
- Fez (video game), a 2012 puzzle-platform game

=== Music ===
- "The Fez", a song from Steely Dan's 1976 album The Royal Scam
- "Fez – Being Born", a song from U2's 2009 album No Line on the Horizon
- Live at Fez, a 2004 album by Bree Sharp
- Live from Fez, a 2005 album by David Berkeley

== Other ==
- Fès–Saïs Airport (IATA code: FEZ), an airport serving Fès in Morocco
- Fez (nightclub), a nightclub and restaurant in New York City's NoHo District
- Fez Whatley (born 1964), American talk radio host and comedian
- FEZ-like protein, a family of eukaryotic proteins
- Free economic zone, designated area in which companies are taxed very lightly or not at all

== See also ==
- FES (disambiguation)
- The Silver Fez, a 2009 South African documentary film
