= TMEM106A =

Protein-coding gene in the species Homo sapiens

Identifiers
- Aliases: TMEM106A, transmembrane protein 106A
- External IDs: MGI: 1922056; HomoloGene: 16996; GeneCards: TMEM106A; OMA:TMEM106A - orthologs

Gene location (Human)
Chr.	Chromosome 17 (human)
Band	17q21.31	Start	43,211,835 bp
Band	17q21.31	End	43,220,041 bp

Gene location (Mouse)
Chr.	Chromosome 11 (mouse)
Band	11|11 D	Start	101,473,068 bp
Band	11|11 D	End	101,482,614 bp
RNA expression pattern
Bgee	Human / Mouse (ortholog); Top expressed in: buccal mucosa cell; renal medulla; pylorus; synovial membrane; monocyte; tibia; bone marrow cell; gonad; appendix; parietal pleura / Top expressed in: right kidney; lumbar spinal ganglion; human kidney; epithelium of small intestine; ileum; intestinal villus; stroma of bone marrow; proximal tubule; jejunum; duodenum; More reference expression data
BioGPS	n/a
Gene ontology
Molecular function	molecular function
Cellular component	integral component of membrane; membrane; plasma membrane
Biological process	biological process; CD80 biosynthetic process; CD86 biosynthetic process; macrophage activation; positive regulation of I-kappaB kinase/NF-kappaB signaling; positive regulation of MAPK cascade; positive regulation of MHC class II biosynthetic process; positive regulation of nitric oxide metabolic process; immune system process; innate immune response
Sources:Amigo / QuickGO
Orthologs
Species	Human	Mouse
Entrez	113277	217203
Ensembl	ENSG00000184988	ENSMUSG00000034947
UniProt	Q96A25	Q8VC04
RefSeq (mRNA)	NM_001291586; NM_001291587; NM_001291588; NM_145041	NM_144830; NM_001359325; NM_001359326; NM_001359327
RefSeq (protein)	NP_001278515; NP_001278516; NP_001278517; NP_659478	NP_659079; NP_001346254; NP_001346255; NP_001346256
Location (UCSC)	Chr 17: 43.21 – 43.22 Mb	Chr 11: 101.47 – 101.48 Mb
PubMed search
- Wikidata
View/Edit Human	View/Edit Mouse

TMEM106A is a gene that encodes the transmembrane protein 106A (TMEM106A) in Homo sapiens. It is located at 17q21.31 on the plus strand next to cancer-related genes NBR1 and BRCA1. The TMEM106A gene contains a domain of unknown function, DUF1356.

== Protein structure ==
The TMEM106A protein has a molecular weight of 28.9 kDa. It has 262 amino acids, 240 of which are in the domain of function. The protein has a transmembrane region. There is evidence for a secondary transmembrane region in humans but this region is not conserved in related orthologs. The protein does not contain a signal peptide. The protein structure contains a similar proportion of alpha-helix and beta-strand secondary structures (this does not include transmembrane structures).

TMEM106A protein with beta-sheets (red), alpha-helices (blue), and transmembrane region (grey)

There are several areas for post-translational modification for TMEM106A including:

- Phosphorylation,
- N-glycosylation
- Lysine glycosylation

== Homology ==
=== Paralogs ===
The TMEM106A gene has two paralogs: TMEM106B and TMEM106C. These paralogs belong to the gene family pfam07092, which belongs to the DUF1356 superfamily. This family consists of several mammalian proteins that are around 250 amino acids in length. TMEM106B and TMEM106C are conserved in invertebrates to mammals.

Protein	Accession number	Amino Acids	Identity Percent	Highest Expression
TMEM106A	AAI46977	262	100	Kidney
TMEM106B	NP_001127704	274	43	Ubiquitous
TMEM106C	AAI07793	231	36	Ubiquitous

=== Orthologs ===
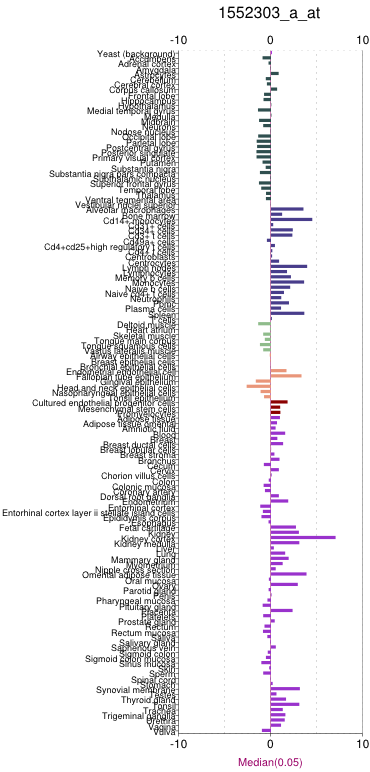
Expression of TMEM106A in human tissues

The TMEM106A gene has been found in only the Chordate phylum. Of the three subphyla, TMEM106A is most commonly found in Vertebrata and has also been found in select members of Tunicata, which are invertebrate marine filter feeders. This phylum split occurred 722.5 million years ago. TMEM106A has not been seen in bacteria, plants, or fungi.

Organism	Common name	Accession number	Amino Acids	Identity Percent	Notes
Homo sapiens	Human	AAI46977.1	262	100	Mammal
Pan troglodytes	Chimpanzee	XP_001154896.2	262	99.2	Mammal
Pongo abelii	Orangutan	XP_002827523.1	262	96.2	Mammal
Callithrix jacchus	Marmoset	XP_002748067.1	262	90.5	Mammal
Canis lupus familiaris	Dog	XP_548074.2	262	84.8	Mammal
Mus musculus	Mouse	AAH22145.1	261	66.4	Mammal
Xenopus borealis	Marsabit Clawed Frog	ACC55056.1	262	59.5	Reptile
Danio rerio	Zebrafish	AAH50177.1	282	34.5	Fish
Oikopleura dioica	Sea-squirt	CBY08060.1	249	27.8	Invertebrate

== Expression ==
TMEM106A is expressed in several human tissues. The tissues with highest expression are uterus, kidneys, small intestine, and stomach. EST profiles for orthologs show expression is conserved with greatest expression in kidneys and lesser expression in several other areas. Some tissues never show expression including: muscle, adipose tissue, and bone.

== Gene neighborhood ==
In Homo sapiens, TMEM106A is located next to NBR1, a gene identified as an ovarian tumor antigen monitored in ovarian cancer. It is also located near BRCA1, a breast cancer tumor suppressor gene. The first 140 amino acids of the TMEM106A protein, including portions of DUF1356 and a transmembrane region, are deleted along with BRCA1 during early-onset breast cancer.

Gene neighborhood of TMEM106A
