= WWC1 =

Protein-coding gene in the species Homo sapiens

Identifiers
- Aliases: WWC1, HBEBP3, HBEBP36, KIBRA, MEMRYQTL, PPP1R168, WW and C2 domain containing 1
- External IDs: OMIM: 610533; MGI: 2388637; GeneCards: WWC1
Available structures
PDB	Ortholog search: PDBe RCSB
PDB	List of PDB id codes 2Z0U

Gene location (Human)
Chr.	Chromosome 5 (human)
Band	5q34	Start	168,291,645 bp
Band	5q34	End	168,472,303 bp

Gene location (Mouse)
Chr.	Chromosome 11 (mouse)
Band	11|11 A4	Start	35,729,227 bp
Band	11|11 A4	End	35,871,354 bp
RNA expression pattern
Bgee	Human / Mouse (ortholog); Top expressed in: ventricular zone; parotid gland; buccal mucosa cell; renal medulla; caudate nucleus; putamen; kidney tubule; human kidney; nucleus accumbens; islet of Langerhans / Top expressed in: vestibular membrane of cochlear duct; Epithelium of choroid plexus; lacrimal gland; choroid plexus of fourth ventricle; retinal pigment epithelium; right lung lobe; parotid gland; vestibular sensory epithelium; ciliary body; conjunctival fornix; More reference expression data
BioGPS	n/a
Gene ontology
Molecular function	transcription coactivator activity; kinase binding; protein binding; molecular adaptor activity
Cellular component	cytoplasm; cytosol; cell projection; membrane; plasma membrane; ruffle membrane; perinuclear region of cytoplasm; nucleus; protein-containing complex
Biological process	regulation of transcription, DNA-templated; negative regulation of transcription by RNA polymerase II; hippo signaling; transcription, DNA-templated; negative regulation of hippo signaling; establishment of cell polarity; regulation of hippo signaling; negative regulation of organ growth; cell migration; positive regulation of MAPK cascade; regulation of intracellular transport; positive regulation of transcription of Notch receptor target
Sources:Amigo / QuickGO
Orthologs
Databases	NCBI: entry; OMA: entry
Species	Human	Mouse
Entrez	23286	211652
Ensembl	ENSG00000113645	ENSMUSG00000018849
UniProt	Q8IX03	Q5SXA9
RefSeq (mRNA)	NM_001161661; NM_001161662; NM_015238	NM_170779
RefSeq (protein)	NP_001155133; NP_001155134; NP_056053	NP_740749
Location (UCSC)	Chr 5: 168.29 – 168.47 Mb	Chr 11: 35.73 – 35.87 Mb
PubMed search
- Wikidata
View/Edit Human	View/Edit Mouse

Protein KIBRA also known as kidney and brain expressed protein (KIBRA) or WW domain-containing protein 1 (WWC1) is a protein that in humans is encoded by the WWC1 gene.

== Research on human memory ==
A single nucleotide polymorphism (rs17070145) in the gene has been associated with human memory performance and cognitive ability in various studies since 2006. While no significant support for KIBRA's association with memory was found in a 2008 study with 584 subjects, the original 2006 study was replicated in a smaller sample of an elderly population in 2008. Two subsequent studies in 2009 in indicated that KIBRA is specifically associated with forgetting of non-semantic material as well as cognitive flexibility among smokers and non-smokers. KIBRA SNPs have been shown to increase hippocampal volume and affect spatial ability and scientific achievement.

Studies have also begun to investigate the role of KIBRA in Alzheimer's disease.

== Interactions ==
KIBRA has at least 10 interaction partners, including synaptopodin, PKCζ and Dendrin, most of which modify synaptic plasticity. For instance, Dendrin is a post-synaptic protein with expression regulated by sleep deprivation. KIBRA has been shown to interact with Protein kinase Mζ.
