= TEDC2 =

Protein-coding gene in the species Homo sapiens

Identifiers
- Aliases: TEDC2, C16orf59, chromosome 16 open reading frame 59, tubulin epsilon and delta complex 2
- External IDs: MGI: 1919266; GeneCards: TEDC2

Gene location (Human)
Chr.	Chromosome 16 (human)
Band	16p13.3	Start	2,460,086 bp
Band	16p13.3	End	2,464,963 bp

Gene location (Mouse)
Chr.	Chromosome 17 (mouse)
Band	17|17 A3.3	Start	24,434,028 bp
Band	17|17 A3.3	End	24,439,825 bp
RNA expression pattern
Bgee	Human / Mouse (ortholog); Top expressed in: gonad; mucosa of transverse colon; testicle; ventricular zone; ganglionic eminence; right testis; left testis; apex of heart; stromal cell of endometrium; prefrontal cortex / Top expressed in: left lobe of liver; genital tubercle; zygote; tail of embryo; pineal gland; embryo; epiblast; hand; embryo; yolk sac; More reference expression data
BioGPS	n/a
Orthologs
Databases	NCBI: entry; OMA: entry
Species	Human	Mouse
Entrez	80178	72016
Ensembl	ENSG00000162062	ENSMUSG00000024118
UniProt	Q7L2K0	Q6GQV0
RefSeq (mRNA)	NM_025108	NM_028056
RefSeq (protein)	NP_079384	NP_082332
Location (UCSC)	Chr 16: 2.46 – 2.46 Mb	Chr 17: 24.43 – 24.44 Mb
PubMed search
- Wikidata
View/Edit Human	View/Edit Mouse

Tubulin epsilon and delta complex 2 (TEDC2), also known as Chromosome 16 open reading frame 59 (C16orf59), is a protein that in humans is encoded by the TEDC2 gene. Its NCBI accession number is NP_079384.2.

== Gene ==
A diagram from NCBI showing TEDC2 and its gene neighborhood on chromosome 16.

=== Locus ===
TEDC2 is found on chromosome 16 at location 16p13.3, or chr16:2,460,080-2,464,963 (spanning 4883 bp) on the plus strand.

== Homology and evolution ==
=== Orthologs ===
TEDC2 appeared between 684-797 million years ago. Its most distant ortholog is found in Branchiostoma floridae, the Florida lancelet, which diverged from other chordates around 684 million years ago. However, the gene arose more recently than 797 million years ago, when protostomes and deuterostomes diverged, as it is not found in any invertebrates. A table showing 20 selected orthologs is below, found with NCBI BLAST.

Genus and species	Common name	Clade	Date of divergence (estimated)	Accession number	Length	Identity	Similarity
Homo sapiens	Human	Mammalia	0 MYA	NP_079384.2	433 aa	100%	100%
Pan troglodytes	Chimpanzee	Mammalia	6.65 MYA	XP_001163226.2	433 aa	98%	98%
Mus musculus	House mouse	Mammalia	90 MYA	NP_082332.1	436 aa	62%	72%
Orcinus orca	Orca	Mammalia	96 MYA	XP_012388677.1	445 aa	71%	78%
Vulpes vulpes	Red fox	Mammalia	96 MYA	XP_025840713.1	432 aa	68%	74%
Dasypus novemcinctus	Nine-banded armadillo	Mammalia	105 MYA	XP_012385078.1	469 aa	69%	77%
Cyanistes caeruleus	Eurasian blue tit	Aves	312 MYA	XP_023792200.1	366 aa	44%	59%
Pygoscelis adeliae	Adélie penguin	Aves	312 MYA	XP_009325519.1	490 aa	43%	58%
Columba livia	Rock dove	Aves	312 MYA	XP_021147488.1	511 aa	43%	56%
Numida meleagris	Helmeted guineafowl	Aves	312 MYA	XP_021267460.1	574 aa	40%	67%
Dromaius novaehollandiae	Emu	Aves	312 MYA	XP_025956253.1	547 aa	40%	68%
Anolis carolinensis	Green anole	Reptilia	312 MYA	XP_008122311.2	473 aa	32%	47%
Python bivittatus	Burmese python	Reptilia	312 MYA	XP_007433089.1	607 aa	32%	50%
Pogona vitticeps	Bearded dragon	Reptilia	312 MYA	XP_020663843.1	578 aa	31%	45%
Xenopus tropicalis	Western clawed frog	Amphibia	352 MYA	XP_002932464.1	452 aa	30%	45%
Lepisosteus oculatus	Spotted gar	Osteichthyes	435 MYA	XP_015215377.1	193 aa	37%	48%
Scleropages formosus	Asian arowana	Osteichthyes	435 MYA	XP_018598511.1	186 aa	29%	47%
Paramormyrops kingsleyae	Elephantfish	Osteichthyes	435 MYA	XP_023666461.1	473 aa	29%	46%
Callorhinchus milii	Australian ghostshark	Chondrichthyes	473 MYA	XP_007891790.1	540 aa	32%	49%
Branchiostoma floridae	Florida lancelet	Cephalochordata	684 MYA	XP_002611730.1	602 aa	23%	42%

=== Paralogs ===
There are no other members of the TEDC2 gene family, as it has no paralogs in any living organisms.

== Expression ==
=== Transcription factors ===
Conserved predicted transcription factor binding sites found in the 5' region upstream of TEDC2 are WT1, ZKSCAN3 (x2), AREB6, MZF1 (x2), ATF6, ER, and P53. This suggests that these transcription factors in particular, and especially ZKSCAN3 and MZF1 on the basis of multiple conserved binding sites, are crucial in the regulation of TEDC2. ZKSCAN3 is a transcriptional repressor of autophagy, and MZF1 is thought to play a role as a tumor suppressor and regulator of cell proliferation. These conserved MZF1 sites, along with the conserved p53 site, suggest that TEDC2 could play a role in cell proliferation and can therefore impact the genesis and development of cancer.

=== Localization ===
TEDC2 is predicted to be localized to the nucleus and may also be present in the cytoplasm, mitochondria, peroxisomes, and extracellular space.

=== Expression ===
It is highly expressed in the testis and EBV-transformed lymphocytes. It is also highly expressed in lymph node, fetal liver, early erythroid cell, and B-lymphoblasts. It is also seen at higher levels in both embryonic stem cells and induced pluripotent stem cells than fibroblasts. Finally, relative to other genes, TEDC2 expression significantly decreases in breast cancer cells upon estrogen starvation.

=== Transcript variants ===
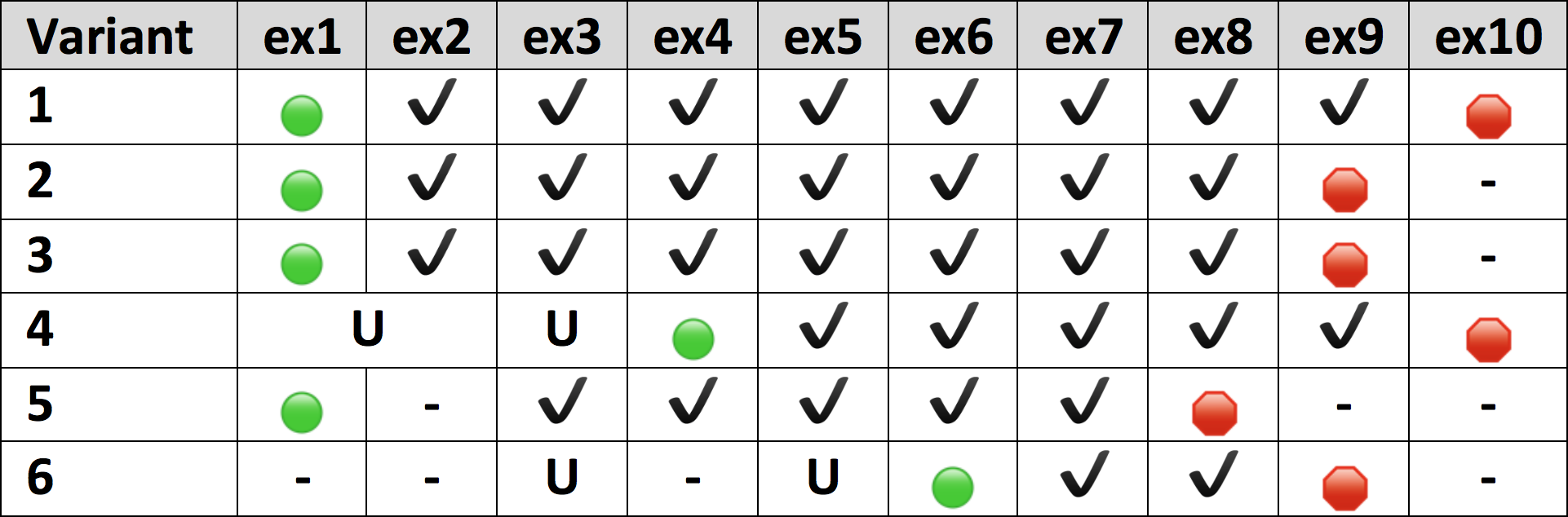
A table showing which exons are found in the 6 TEDC2 isoforms. Green = contains a start codon. Red = contains a stop codon. Check = Exon included in the final mRNA transcript. -- = exon is excluded from the final mRNA transcript. U = exon is present but is untranslated.

The gene has 10 exons. The gene has 13 alternatively spliced transcripts, with 6 coding for a protein, 1 undergoing nonsense-mediated decay, and 6 being retained introns.

== Protein ==
=== General features ===
TEDC2 is encoded by the TEDC2 gene with NCBI accession number NM_025108.3. The protein is 433 amino acids long with a predicted molecular weight of 46.4 kDa. There is an antibody against the protein, but a sample western blot image is not available.

=== Domains ===
TEDC2 contains a domain of unknown function, DUF4693, which in humans spans from proteins 148-431, approximately the last two-thirds of the protein.

=== Secondary structure ===
Using online bioinformatics tools, TEDC2 is predicted to have many alpha helices, and it has two well-conserved predicted beta-pleated sheets near the end of the protein.

=== Tertiary structure ===
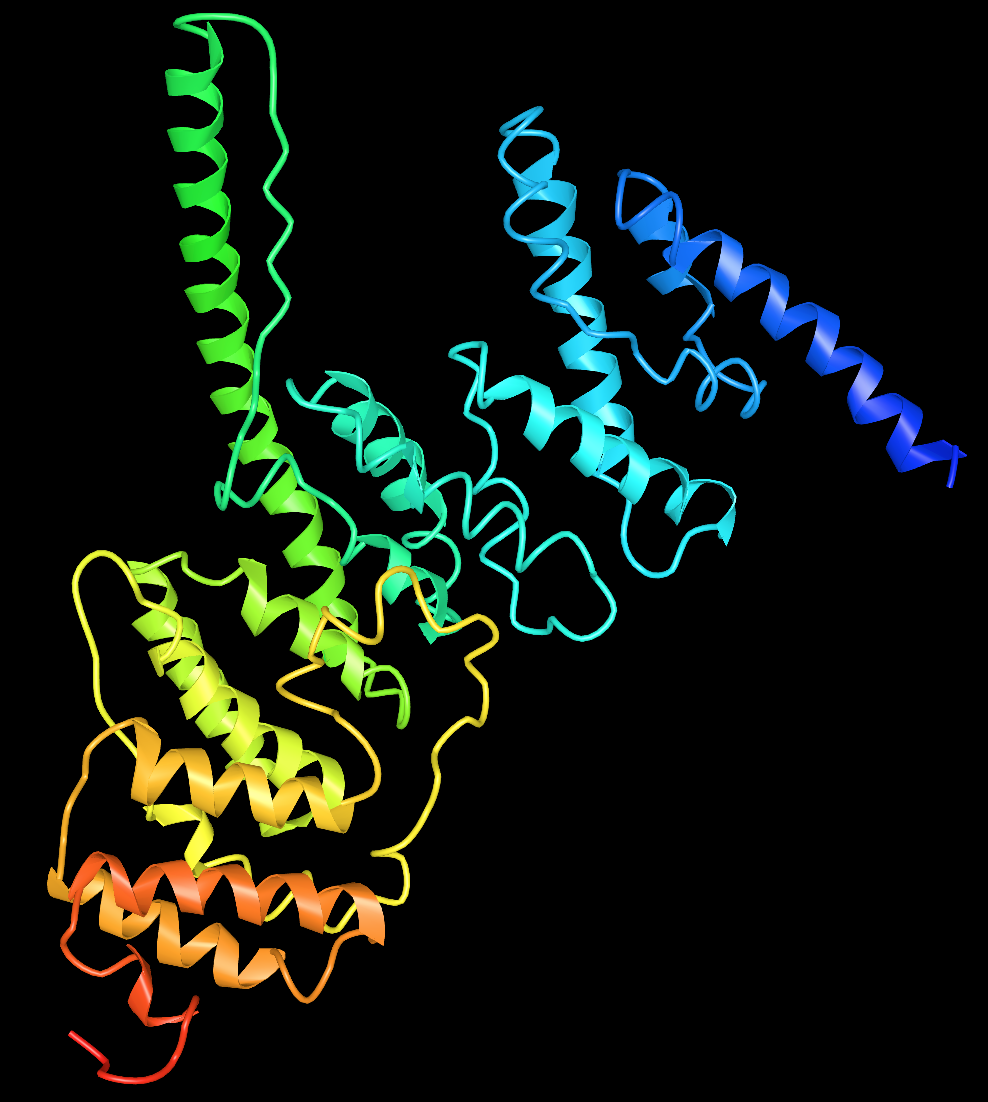
The predicted TEDC2 tertiary structure model of highest probability, generated by I-TASSER.

TEDC2 is predicted to form tertiary structure based on its alpha helices. Many of these predicted alpha helices are highly conserved in orthologs, and one example of predicted tertiary structure generated by I-TASSER is shown to the right.

=== Post-translational modifications ===
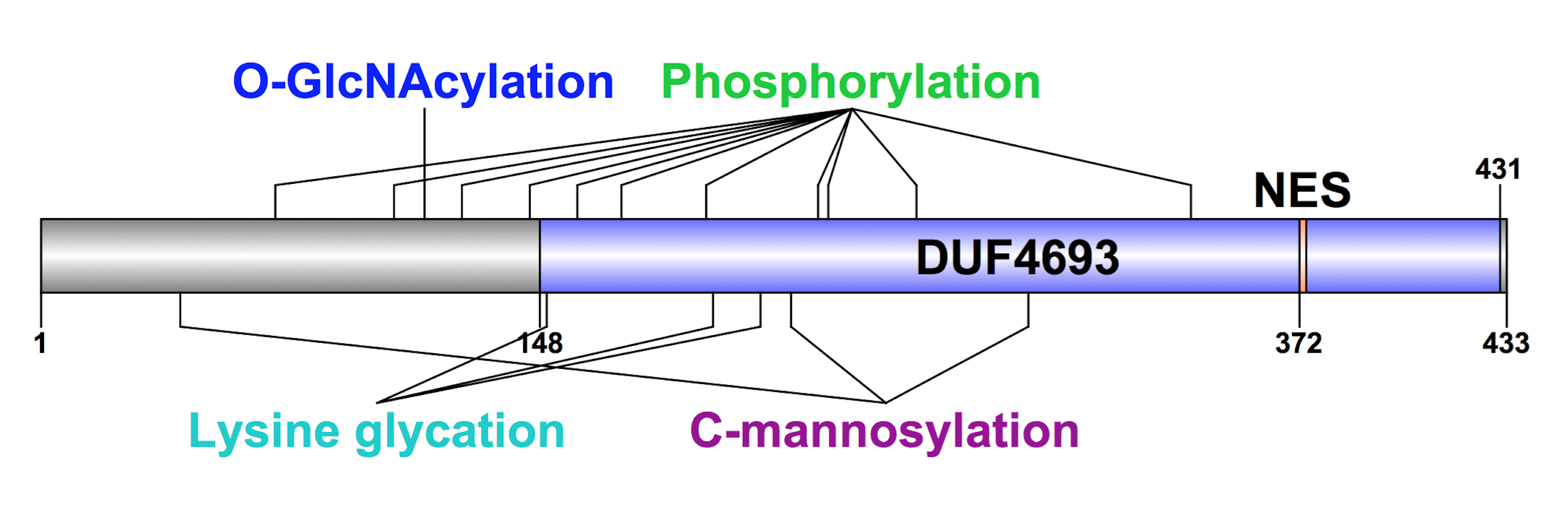
Graphical representation of TEDC2 showing domains and modification sites, created with DOG.

TEDC2 has a well conserved predicted O-GlcNAc site at S114 in humans. O-GlcNAcylated proteins are found mostly in the nucleus, sometimes also being found in the cytoplasm, and this is a dynamic modification, frequently being removed and reattached.

TEDC2 also has three conserved, predicted C-mannosylation sites. The function of C-mannosylation is still unclear, but it is the attachment of an alpha-mannose to a tryptophan.

TEDC2 also has many possible phosphorylation sites, including seven that are well-conserved. Phosphorylation is an important means of protein regulation, activation, and inactivation, so it is difficult to determine any specific function from the presence of a serine or threonine that could be phosphorylated.

== Interactions ==
=== Protein-protein interactions ===
KDM1A, a lysine-specific demethylase, was shown to be physically associated with TEDC2. TEDC2 also interacts with FEZ1, a fasciculation and elongation protein. FEZ1, or fasciculation and elongation protein 1, is necessary for axon growth but is also thought to be involved in transcriptional control.

There is also experimental evidence for TEDC2 interaction with TUBE1 and C14orf80. TUBE1, or Tubulin epsilon 1, is involved with the centrioles during cell division, and the function of C14orf80 is unknown. TEDC2 is also co-expressed with CDC45, or cell division control protein 45, which is required for initiation of chromosomal DNA replication, as well as co-expression with CDT1, a DNA replication licensing factor required for pre-replication assembly.

== Function and clinical significance ==
The function of TEDC2 is not yet known with certainty by the scientific community, but its expression profile, predicted transcription factor binding sites, and other protein-protein interactions enable some predictions. TEDC2 is localized in the nucleus and is often expressed in developing tissues such as stem cells as well as differentiated fetal tissue, so it likely plays a role in DNA replication and/or cell division. This also fits with TEDC2's predicted or known protein-protein interactions, as it may interact with proteins involved in cell division (TUBE1, CDC45, CDT1), as well as remain under transcriptional control of tumor suppressors (WT1, MZF1, P53). Additionally, given the presence of an estrogen-response element binding-site, it is possible that TEDC2 plays a role in tumor development when mutated.
