= Protein kinase C zeta type =

Mammalian protein found in humans

PRKCZ

Identifiers
- Aliases: PRKCZ, PKC-ZETA, PKC2, protein kinase C zeta
- External IDs: OMIM: 176982; MGI: 97602; GeneCards: PRKCZ
Enzyme activity
EC #	BRENDA	ExPASy	KEGG	MetaCyc
2.7.11.13	↗	↗	↗	↗

Gene location (Human)
Chr.	Chromosome 1 (human)
Band	1p36.33	Start	2,050,411 bp
Band	1p36.33	End	2,185,395 bp

Gene location (Mouse)
Chr.	Chromosome 4 (mouse)
Band	4 E2|4 86.17 cM	Start	155,344,586 bp
Band	4 E2|4 86.17 cM	End	155,445,818 bp
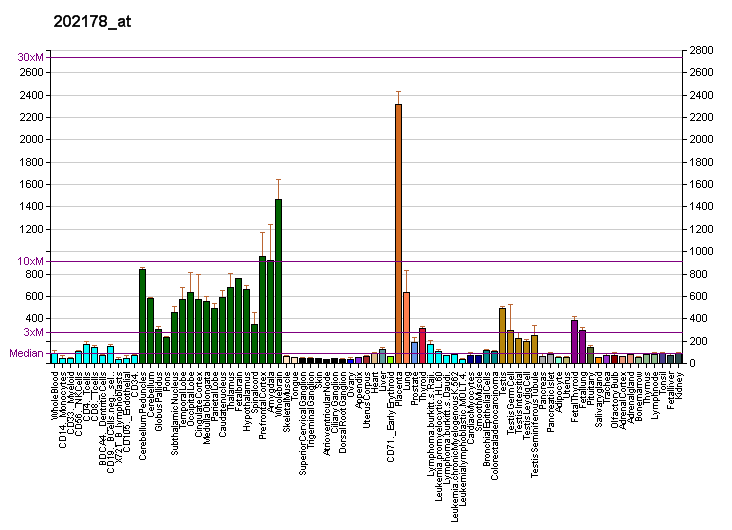
RNA expression pattern
Bgee	Human / Mouse (ortholog); Top expressed in: right hemisphere of cerebellum; middle temporal gyrus; right frontal lobe; pars compacta; lateral nuclear group of thalamus; Brodmann area 9; prefrontal cortex; pars reticulata; Brodmann area 23; primary visual cortex / Top expressed in: superior frontal gyrus; dentate gyrus of hippocampal formation granule cell; cerebellar cortex; neural layer of retina; right kidney; primary visual cortex; olfactory tubercle; nucleus accumbens; prefrontal cortex; cerebellar vermis; More reference expression data
BioGPS	More reference expression data
Gene ontology
Molecular function	phospholipase binding; protein domain specific binding; kinase activity; ATP binding; protein kinase activity; metal ion binding; protein serine/threonine kinase activity; insulin receptor substrate binding; transferase activity; 14-3-3 protein binding; potassium channel regulator activity; protein binding; protein kinase binding; nucleotide binding; protein kinase C activity
Cellular component	cytoplasm; filamentous actin; endosome; nuclear envelope; membrane; cell-cell junction; bicellular tight junction; microtubule organizing center; apical cortex; perinuclear region of cytoplasm; nucleus; nuclear matrix; apical plasma membrane; membrane raft; extracellular exosome; intracellular membrane-bounded organelle; myelin sheath abaxonal region; cell cortex; vesicle; cell junction; cell leading edge; axon hillock; cytosol; plasma membrane; stress fiber; postsynaptic density; protein-containing complex; Schaffer collateral - CA1 synapse; glutamatergic synapse
Biological process	positive regulation of glucose import; insulin receptor signaling pathway; protein heterooligomerization; negative regulation of hydrolase activity; protein kinase C signaling; protein phosphorylation; negative regulation of insulin receptor signaling pathway; cell surface receptor signaling pathway; activation of phospholipase D activity; positive regulation of synaptic transmission; positive regulation of ERK1 and ERK2 cascade; positive regulation of excitatory postsynaptic potential; transforming growth factor beta receptor signaling pathway; negative regulation of protein-containing complex assembly; negative regulation of peptidyl-tyrosine phosphorylation; establishment of cell polarity; cellular response to insulin stimulus; protein localization to plasma membrane; inflammatory response; phosphorylation; positive regulation of cell-matrix adhesion; membrane depolarization; negative regulation of apoptotic process; positive regulation of interleukin-4 production; positive regulation of protein transport; positive regulation of NF-kappaB transcription factor activity; positive regulation of insulin receptor signaling pathway; positive regulation of T-helper 2 cell cytokine production; microtubule cytoskeleton organization; actin cytoskeleton reorganization; activation of protein kinase B activity; membrane hyperpolarization; vesicle transport along microtubule; neuron projection extension; long-term memory; peptidyl-serine phosphorylation; positive regulation of cell population proliferation; positive regulation of T-helper 2 cell differentiation; cell migration; signal transduction; long-term potentiation; intracellular signal transduction; regulation of neurotransmitter receptor localization to postsynaptic specialization membrane
Sources:Amigo / QuickGO
Orthologs
Databases	NCBI: entry; OMA: entry
Species	Human	Mouse
Entrez	5590	18762
Ensembl	ENSG00000067606	ENSMUSG00000029053
UniProt	Q05513	Q02956
RefSeq (mRNA)	NM_001033581; NM_001033582; NM_001242874; NM_002744; NM_001350803 NM_001350804; NM_001350805; NM_001350806	NM_001039079; NM_008860; NM_001355178
RefSeq (protein)	NP_001028753; NP_001028754; NP_001229803; NP_002735; NP_001337732 NP_001337733; NP_001337734; NP_001337735	NP_001034168; NP_032886; NP_001342107
Location (UCSC)	Chr 1: 2.05 – 2.19 Mb	Chr 4: 155.34 – 155.45 Mb
PubMed search
- Wikidata
View/Edit Human	View/Edit Mouse

Protein kinase C, zeta (PKCζ), also known as PRKCZ, is a protein in humans that is encoded by the PRKCZ gene. The PRKCZ gene encodes at least two alternative transcripts, the full-length PKCζ and an N-terminal truncated form PKMζ. PKMζ is thought to be responsible for maintaining long-term memories in the brain. The importance of PKCζ in the creation and maintenance of long-term potentiation was first described by Todd Sacktor and his colleagues at the SUNY Downstate Medical Center in 1993.

== Structure ==
PKC-zeta has an N-terminal regulatory domain, followed by a hinge region and a C-terminal catalytic domain. Second messengers stimulate PKCs by binding to the regulatory domain, translocating the enzyme from cytosol to membrane, and producing a conformational change that removes auto-inhibition of the PKC catalytic protein kinase activity. PKM-zeta, a brain-specific isoform of PKC-zeta generated from an alternative transcript, lacks the regulatory region of full-length PKC-zeta and is therefore constitutively active.

PKMζ is the independent catalytic domain of PKCζ and, lacking an autoinhibitory regulatory domain of the full-length PKCζ, is constitutively and persistently active, without the need of a second messenger. It was originally thought of as being a cleavage product of full-length PKCζ, an atypical isoform of protein kinase C (PKC). Like other PKC isoforms, PKCζ is a serine/threonine kinase that adds phosphate groups to target proteins. It is atypical in that unlike other PKC isoforms, PKCζ does not require calcium or diacylglycerol (DAG) to become active, but rather relies on a different second messenger, presumably generated through a phosphoinositide 3-kinase (PI3-kinase) pathway. It is now known that PKMζ is not the result of cleavage of full-length PKCζ, but rather, in the mammalian brain, is translated from its own brain-specific mRNA, that is transcribed by an internal promoter within the PKCζ gene. The promoter for full-length PKCζ is largely inactive in the forebrain and so PKMζ is the dominant form of ζ in the forebrain and the only PKM that is translated from its own mRNA.

== Function ==
=== PKCζ ===
Atypical PKC (aPKC) isoforms [zeta (this enzyme) and lambda/iota] play important roles in insulin-stimulated glucose transport. Human adipocytes contain PKC-zeta, rather than PKC-lambda/iota, as their major aPKC. Inhibition of the PKCζ enzyme inhibits insulin-stimulated glucose transport while activation of PKCζ increases glucose transport.

=== PKMζ ===
PKMζ is thought to be responsible for maintaining the late phase of long-term potentiation (LTP). LTP is one of the major cellular mechanisms that are widely considered to underlie learning and memory. This theory arose from the observation that PKMζ perfused into neurons causes synaptic potentiation, and selective inhibitors of PKMζ like zeta inhibitory peptide (ZIP), when bath applied one hour after tetanization, inhibit the late phase or maintenance of LTP. Thus, PKMζ was thought to be both necessary and sufficient for maintaining LTP. Subsequent work showed that inhibiting PKMζ reversed LTP maintenance when applied up to 5 hours after LTP was induced in hippocampal slices, and after 22 hours in vivo. Inhibiting PKMζ in behaving animals erased spatial long-term memories in the hippocampus that were up to one month old, without affecting spatial short-term memories, and erased long-term memories for fear conditioning and inhibitory avoidance in the basolateral amygdala. When ZIP was injected into rats' sensorimotor cortices, it erased muscle memories for a task, even after several weeks of training. PKMζ may form a self-perpetuating, positive feedback loop that can persist for months to maintain very long-term memories.

In the neocortex, thought to be the site of storage for most long-term memories, PKMζ inhibition erased associative memories for conditioned taste aversion in the insular cortex, up to 3 months after training. The protein also seems to be involved, through the nucleus accumbens, in the consolidation and reconsolidation of the memory related to drug addiction. Although results from PKCζ/PKMζ-null mice demonstrate LTP and memory appear largely the same as wild-type mice, the normal function of PKMζ in LTP and long-term memory storage was shown to be compensated by the other atypical PKC isoform, PKCι/λ in the knock-out. It has been also shown that PKMζ works together with KIBRA in anchoring its activity so that when a protein degrades and needs to be replaced, the other remains in place, therefore more crucial than each molecule individually is the interaction between them in the persistency of memory.

Alteration in PKMζ may be involved in neurodegeneration Alzheimer's disease.

== Inhibitors ==
- 1,3,5-Trisubstituted Pyrazolines

== Interactions ==
PRKCZ has been shown to interact with:

- AKT3,
- C-Raf,
- C1QBP,
- CENTA1,
- FEZ1,
- FEZ2,
- MAP2K5,
- NFATC2,
- PARD6A,
- PARD6B,
- PAWR,
- PDPK1,
- RELA,
- Src,
- WWC1,
- YWHAB, and
- YWHAQ,
- YWHAZ.
