= Centaurin, alpha 1 =

Protein-coding gene in the species Homo sapiens

ADAP1
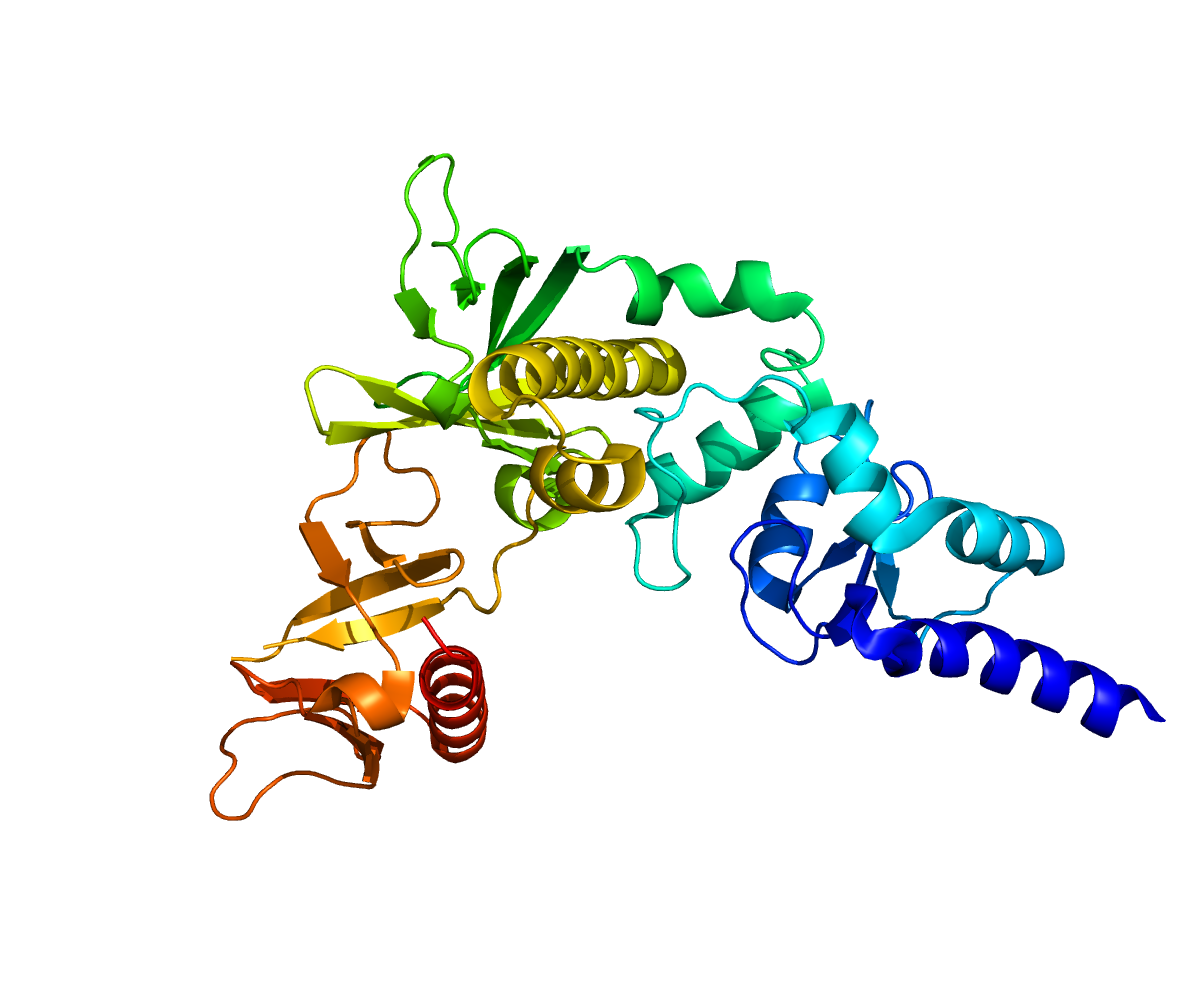

Identifiers
- Aliases: ADAP1, CENTA1, GCS1L, p42IP4, Centaurin, alpha 1, ArfGAP with dual PH domains 1
- External IDs: OMIM: 608114; MGI: 2442201; GeneCards: ADAP1
Available structures
PDB	Human UniProt search: PDBe RCSB
PDB	List of PDB id codes 3FEH, 3FM8, 3LJU, 3MDB

Gene location (Human)
Chr.	Chromosome 7 (human)
Band	7p22.3	Start	897,900 bp
Band	7p22.3	End	955,407 bp

Gene location (Mouse)
Chr.	Chromosome 5 (mouse)
Band	5|5 G2	Start	139,257,631 bp
Band	5|5 G2	End	139,311,377 bp
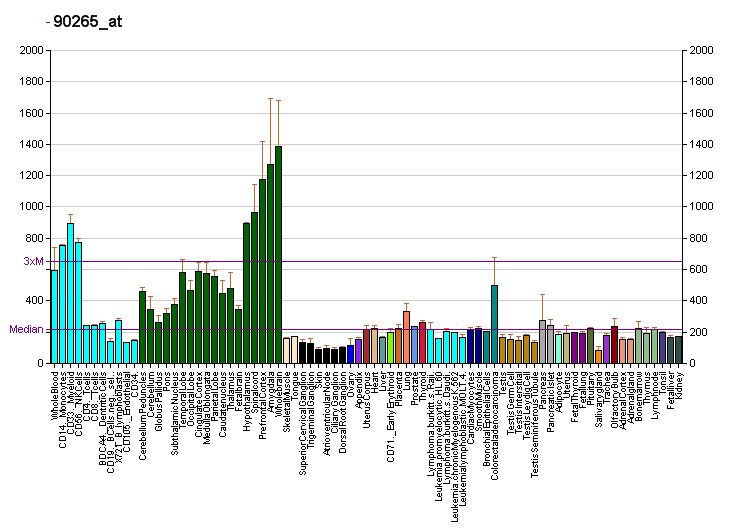

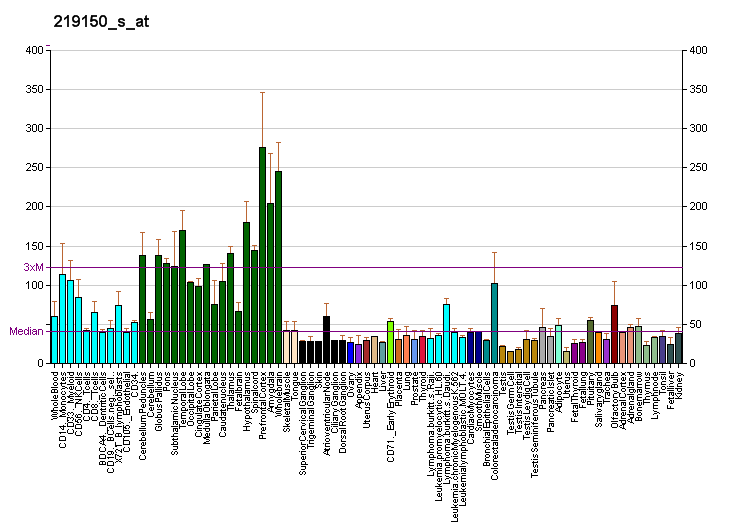

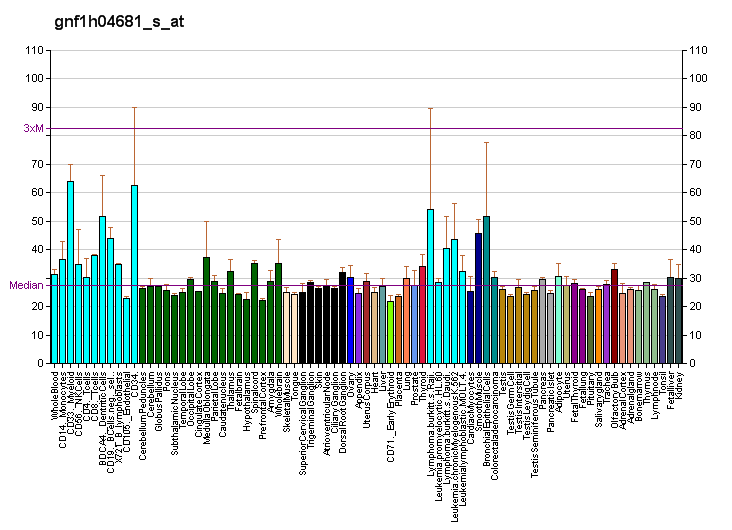
RNA expression pattern
Bgee	Human / Mouse (ortholog); Top expressed in: C1 segment; hippocampus proper; mucosa of transverse colon; anterior cingulate cortex; prefrontal cortex; right frontal lobe; primary visual cortex; dorsolateral prefrontal cortex; Brodmann area 9; temporal lobe / Top expressed in: primary visual cortex; superior frontal gyrus; dentate gyrus of hippocampal formation granule cell; granulocyte; jejunum; cerebellar cortex; piriform cortex; pontine nuclei; prefrontal cortex; primary motor cortex; More reference expression data
BioGPS	More reference expression data
Gene ontology
Molecular function	protein binding; metal ion binding; GTPase activator activity; inositol 1,3,4,5 tetrakisphosphate binding; phosphatidylinositol-3,4,5-trisphosphate binding; phosphatidylinositol bisphosphate binding
Cellular component	cytoplasm; plasma membrane; nucleus; cytosol
Biological process	regulation of GTPase activity; cell surface receptor signaling pathway; positive regulation of GTPase activity
Sources:Amigo / QuickGO
Orthologs
Databases	NCBI: entry; OMA: entry
Species	Human	Mouse
Entrez	11033	231821
Ensembl	ENSG00000105963	ENSMUSG00000056413
UniProt	O75689	n/a
RefSeq (mRNA)	NM_006869; NM_001284308; NM_001284309; NM_001284310; NM_001284311	NM_172723
RefSeq (protein)	NP_001271237; NP_001271238; NP_001271239; NP_001271240; NP_006860	n/a
Location (UCSC)	Chr 7: 0.9 – 0.96 Mb	Chr 5: 139.26 – 139.31 Mb
PubMed search
- Wikidata
View/Edit Human	View/Edit Mouse

Arf-GAP with dual PH domain-containing protein 1 is a protein that in humans is encoded by the ADAP1 gene.

== Interactions ==
Centaurin, alpha 1 has been shown to interact with:

- Casein kinase 1, alpha 1
- Nucleolin,
- P110α,
- PRKCI,
- Protein kinase D1, and
- Protein kinase Mζ.
