= TMEM106C =

Protein-coding gene in the species Homo sapiens

Identifiers
- Aliases: TMEM106C, transmembrane protein 106C
- External IDs: MGI: 1196384; HomoloGene: 11440; GeneCards: TMEM106C; OMA:TMEM106C - orthologs

Gene location (Human)
Chr.	Chromosome 12 (human)
Band	12q13.11	Start	47,963,569 bp
Band	12q13.11	End	47,968,878 bp

Gene location (Mouse)
Chr.	Chromosome 15 (mouse)
Band	15 F1|15 53.96 cM	Start	97,862,081 bp
Band	15 F1|15 53.96 cM	End	97,868,156 bp
RNA expression pattern
Bgee	Human / Mouse (ortholog); Top expressed in: rectum; mucosa of transverse colon; mucosa of sigmoid colon; right lung; Descending thoracic aorta; islet of Langerhans; ascending aorta; body of pancreas; duodenum; right hemisphere of cerebellum / Top expressed in: neural layer of retina; choroid plexus of fourth ventricle; spermatocyte; olfactory epithelium; transitional epithelium of urinary bladder; pituitary gland; Ileal epithelium; right kidney; lacrimal gland; adrenal gland; More reference expression data
BioGPS	n/a
Gene ontology
Molecular function	protein binding; molecular function
Cellular component	integral component of membrane; endoplasmic reticulum membrane; endoplasmic reticulum; membrane; cellular component
Biological process	biological process
Sources:Amigo / QuickGO
Orthologs
Species	Human	Mouse
Entrez	79022	380967
Ensembl	ENSG00000134291	ENSMUSG00000052369
UniProt	Q9BVX2	Q80VP8
RefSeq (mRNA)	NM_024056; NM_001143841; NM_001143842; NM_001143843; NM_001143844 NM_001143845	NM_001252153; NM_201359; NM_001356508
RefSeq (protein)	NP_001137313; NP_001137314; NP_001137315; NP_076961	NP_001239082; NP_958747; NP_001343437
Location (UCSC)	Chr 12: 47.96 – 47.97 Mb	Chr 15: 97.86 – 97.87 Mb
PubMed search
- Wikidata
View/Edit Human	View/Edit Mouse

TMEM106C is a gene that encodes the transmembrane protein 106C (TMEM106C) in Homo sapiens It has been found to be overexpressed in cancer cells and also is related to distal arthrogryposis, a condition of stiff joints and irregular muscle development. The TMEM106C gene contains a domain of unknown function, DUF1356, that spans most of the protein. Transmembrane protein 106C also goes by the aliases MGC5576 or MGC111210, LOC79022.

== Location and gene neighborhood ==
The TMEM106C gene is located on the long arm of the 12th chromosome. It is found at position 12q13.1. This gene spans from 48357225 to 48362667 on chromosome 12. This gene is in between COL2A1, the human type II collagen gene, and VDR, the human Vitamin D Receptor gene. This protein is found to be an integral part of the endoplasm reticulum membrane.

== Protein structure ==
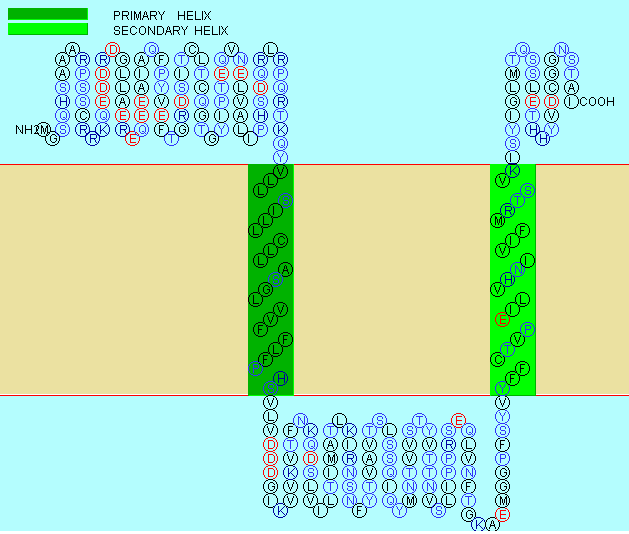
The N and C-terminal ends of the protein are found in the cytosol of the cell

The TMEM106A protein has a molecular weight of 27.9 kdal with a PI of 6.325. It has 250 amino acids, 230 of which are in the domain of unknown function. No signal peptide has been found for this protein but TMEM106C has transmembrane regions which gives evidence for an internal signal peptide. This protein spans the ER membrane 2 times. There is evidence that these transmembrane regions take on helical structures. The predicted structure of the protein is shown to the left:

TMEM106C is valine-rich with no tryptophan.

There are several areas for post-translational modification for TMEM106A including:

- Phosphorylation
- Kinase-Specific Phosphoylation
- N-glycosylation

== Expression ==
This gene is highly expressed. TMEM106C is expressed 4.9 times the average gene. TMEM106C has ubiquitous expression. It can be found expressed in many tissues types. Tissue types with high expression included the adrenal gland, eye, reproductive organs, cervix and blood. High expression was found using EST and GEO data.

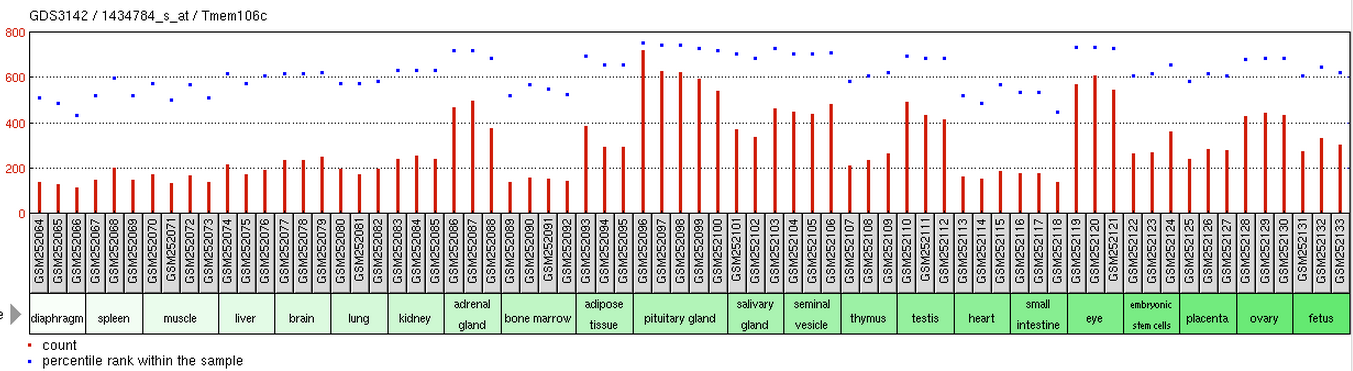
Expression Patterns found in Various Tissue Types

This gene is also found overexpressed in cancer cells. This gene has found to be expressed three times more in adrenal tumor and twice more in bladder carcinoma and retinoblastoma than normal expression.

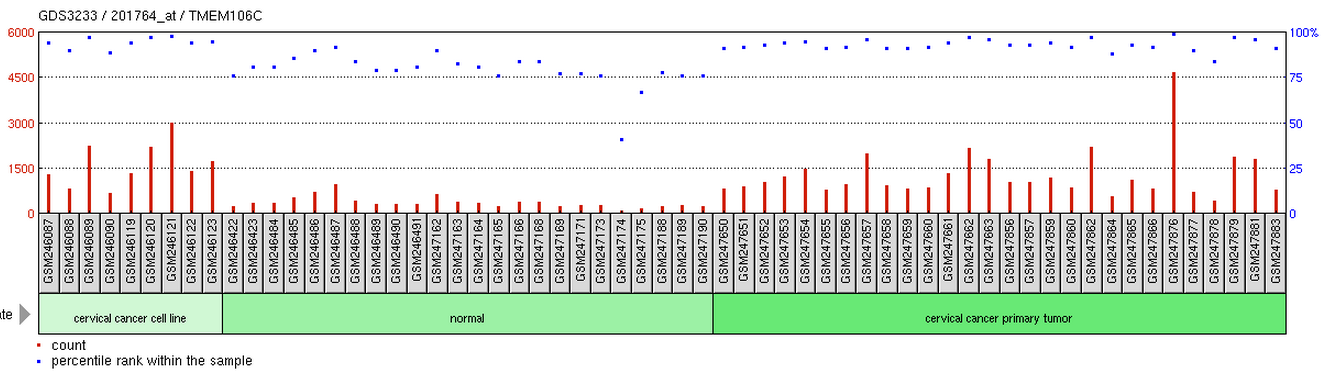
Expression Levels found in Leukemia

It is also found to be highly expressed in breast (mammary gland) tumor, cervical tumor, esophageal tumor, leukemia, liver tumor; lung tumor, pancreatic tumor, prostate cancer, and soft tissue/muscle tissue tumor.

TMEM106C is found in all stages of development from embryoid body, blastocyst, fetus, infant, juvenile and adult.

== Homology ==
=== Paralogs ===
There are two paralogs for TMEM106C. These paralogs are TMEM106A and TMEM106B. Both genes are found highly conserved in Mammalia. TMEM106A is also found to be conserved in invertebrates as well. The protein was found in tapeworms and other invertebrate worms.

Protein	Accession number	Amino acids	Identity percent
TMEM106A	AAI46977	262	36
TMEM106B	NP_001127704	274	43
TMEM106C	NP_001137314.1	250	100

=== Orthologs ===
TMEM106C is highly conserved in Mammalia. Links to sequences can be found in the table below:

Organism	Common name	Accession number	Amino acids	Identity percent	Notes
Homo sapiens	Human	NP_001137314.1	250	100	Mammal
Macaca mulatta	Rhesus macaque	NP_001253653.1	249	98	Mammal
Equus caballus	Horse	XP_001490277.1	249	90	Mammal
Mus musculus	Mouse	NP_001239082.1	260	79	Mammal
Alligator mississippiensis	American alligator	XP_006273403.1	271	77	Reptile
Chrysemys picta bellii	Painted turtle	XP_005291963.1	270	73	Reptile
Falco cherrug	Saker falcon	XP_005436184.1	274	74	Aves
Gallus gallus	Chicken	XP_003643471.1	253	65	Aves
Xenopus tropicalis	Western clawed frog	NP_001016848.1	263	64	Amphibia
Latimeria chalumnae	Coelacanth	XP_005986345.1	258	61	Actinoterygii
Danio rerio	Zebrafish	NP_001070764.1	275	57	Actinoterygii
