= Casein kinase 1, alpha 1 =

Enzyme found in humans

CSNK1A1
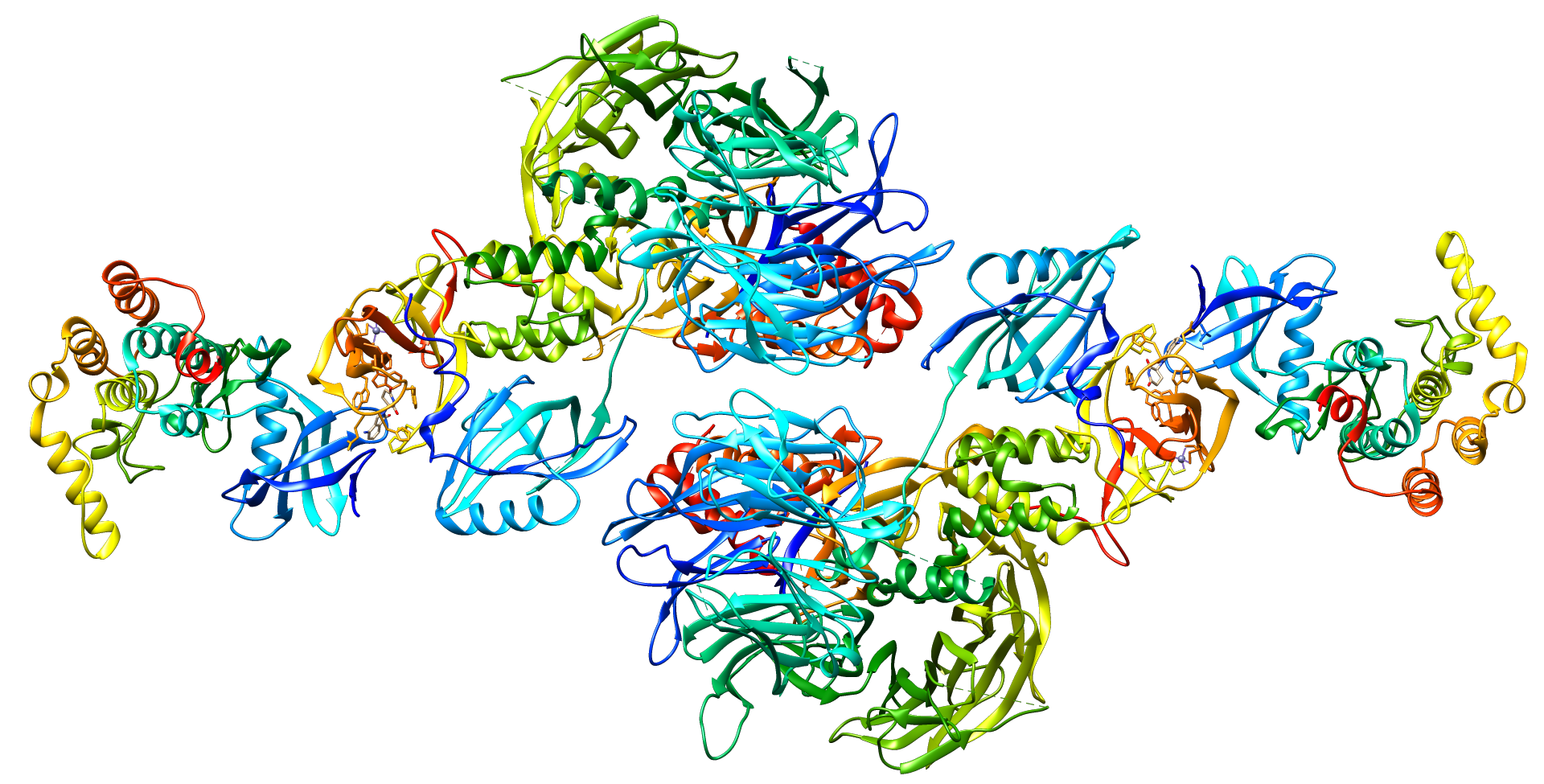

Identifiers
- Aliases: CSNK1A1, CK1, CK1a, CKIa, HEL-S-77p, HLCDGP1, PRO2975, casein kinase 1 alpha 1
- External IDs: OMIM: 600505; MGI: 1934950; GeneCards: CSNK1A1
Available structures
PDB	Ortholog search: PDBe RCSB
PDB	List of PDB id codes 5FQD
Enzyme activity
EC #	BRENDA	ExPASy	KEGG	MetaCyc
2.7.11.1	↗	↗	↗	↗

Gene location (Human)
Chr.	Chromosome 5 (human)
Band	5q32	Start	149,492,982 bp
Band	5q32	End	149,551,471 bp

Gene location (Mouse)
Chr.	Chromosome 18 (mouse)
Band	18|18 E1	Start	61,688,345 bp
Band	18|18 E1	End	61,723,132 bp
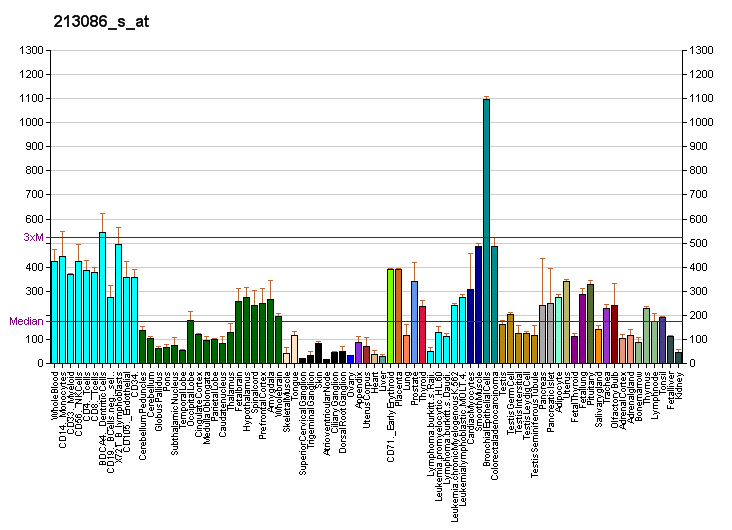

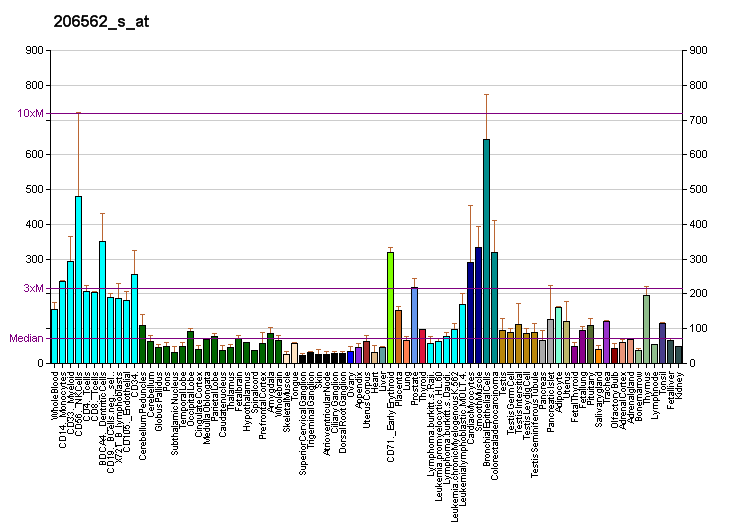

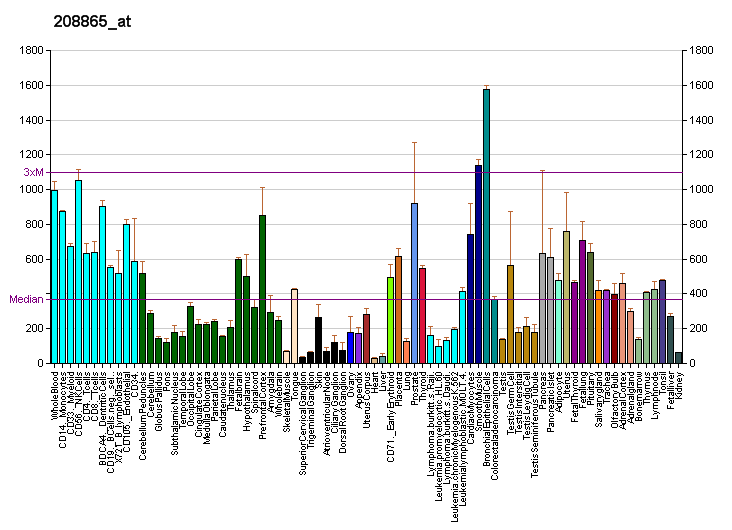
RNA expression pattern
Bgee	Human / Mouse (ortholog); Top expressed in: stromal cell of endometrium; islet of Langerhans; gallbladder; ganglionic eminence; smooth muscle tissue; epithelium of colon; ventricular zone; nipple; Achilles tendon; pylorus / Top expressed in: renal corpuscle; atrioventricular valve; cumulus cell; medullary collecting duct; medial ganglionic eminence; left lung lobe; Gonadal ridge; molar; endocardial cushion; pineal gland; More reference expression data
BioGPS	More reference expression data
Gene ontology
Molecular function	transferase activity; protein kinase activity; nucleotide binding; protein binding; ATP binding; kinase activity; protein serine/threonine kinase activity
Cellular component	cytoplasm; centrosome; nuclear speck; mRNA cleavage and polyadenylation specificity factor complex; membrane; keratin filament; chromosome; microtubule organizing center; chromosome, centromeric region; cytoskeleton; beta-catenin destruction complex; kinetochore; nucleus; cytosol; cilium; cell projection; ciliary basal body; ribonucleoprotein complex
Biological process	regulation of GTP binding; Golgi organization; phosphorylation; cell division; protein phosphorylation; cell surface receptor signaling pathway; peptidyl-serine phosphorylation; phagocytosis; intermediate filament cytoskeleton organization; cell cycle; negative regulation of canonical Wnt signaling pathway; positive regulation of proteasomal ubiquitin-dependent protein catabolic process; signal transduction; proteasome-mediated ubiquitin-dependent protein catabolic process; beta-catenin destruction complex assembly; regulation of cell shape; beta-catenin destruction complex disassembly; Wnt signaling pathway; cell morphogenesis; peptidyl-threonine phosphorylation
Sources:Amigo / QuickGO
Orthologs
Databases	NCBI: entry; OMA: entry
Species	Human	Mouse
Entrez	1452	93687
Ensembl	ENSG00000113712	ENSMUSG00000024576
UniProt	P48729	Q6PJ87
RefSeq (mRNA)	NM_001025105; NM_001271741; NM_001271742; NM_001892	NM_146087; NM_001357498; NM_001357499; NM_001357500
RefSeq (protein)	NP_001020276; NP_001258670; NP_001258671; NP_001883	NP_666199; NP_001344427; NP_001344428; NP_001344429
Location (UCSC)	Chr 5: 149.49 – 149.55 Mb	Chr 18: 61.69 – 61.72 Mb
PubMed search
- Wikidata
View/Edit Human	View/Edit Mouse

Casein kinase I isoform alpha is an enzyme that in humans is encoded by the CSNK1A1 gene.

== Interactions ==
Casein kinase 1, alpha 1 has been shown to interact with Centaurin, alpha 1 and AXIN1.

== See also ==
- Casein kinase 1
