= FES =

FES or Fes may refer to:

== Places ==
- Fez, Morocco
- Festus Memorial Airport, in Missouri, United States
- Kingdom of Fes, now part of Morocco

== Other uses ==
- Fat embolism syndrome
- Feline sarcoma oncogene
- Flame emission spectroscopy, a form of atomic emission spectroscopy
- Front electric sustainer, an electric propulsion for gliders
- Flat Earth Society, creationist organisation
- Flywheel energy storage
- Frente de Estudiantes Sindicalistas, a former Spanish student group
- Friedrich Ebert Foundation (German: Friedrich Ebert Stiftung)
- Fuerzas Especiales, the special forces of the Mexican Navy
- Fulham Enterprise Studio, a school in London
- Functional electrical stimulation
- Guinness Foreign Extra Stout
- Iron(II) sulfide (FeS)
- Persona 3 FES, an add-on disk for Shin Megami Tensei: Persona 3
- FES (from "Phantasm"), the stage name of Japanese singer and voice actress Yui Sakakibara
  - FES, the stage name of Ayase Kishimoto, a character from Chaos;Head (voiced by Yui Sakakibara)
- Fes (That '70s Show), or Fez, a character on That '70s Show

== See also ==
- FE (disambiguation)
- Fez (disambiguation)
