= Dendrin =

Protein

Dendrin is a neural and renal protein whose exact function is still relatively unclear; however, its location in the brain and kidneys is well known as are some of the neural processes it affects. Within the brain, dendrin can be found in neurons and is most notably associated with sleep deprivation. Sleep deprivation causes some areas of the brain dendrin levels to increase, but this increase is insignificant and in total sleep deprivation causes a decrease of the mRNA and protein form of dendrin. Along with two other proteins, MAGI/S-SCAM and α-actinin, dendrin is linked to synaptic plasticity and memory formation in the brain. Nicotine levels have also been shown to have an effect on dendrin expression in the brain. Although unlike sleep deprivation, nicotine increases overall dendrin level. Originally thought to be a brain specific protein, there is now evidence to suggest that dendrin is also found in the kidneys. Dendrin is used to detect glomerulopathy or renal disease, based on its location in the kidneys. Within the kidneys it also works to prevent urinary protein loss. Most studies and information on dendrin pertain specifically to rat or mice brains.

== Structure ==
Dendrin has a similar structure in mice, rats, and humans. The protein is composed of 2,067 nucleotides, is hydrophilic, and is rich in the animo acid proline. Dendrin is a protein kinase substrate that is composed of multiple consensus sites for phosphorylation by protein kinase C, casein kinase 11, CAMP-dependent and proline-dependent kinases, and tyrosine kinase. Surprisingly, the protein structure does not have any secondary structure patterns, such as lengthy regions of α helices or β sheets. Appropriately named, dendrin in its mRNA form is often found in the dendrites of neurons. The unique structure of dendrin allows it to participate in many different processes, such as synaptic plasticity in the brain and disease detection in the kidneys.

== Discovery ==
Dendrin was originally discovered in rat neurons and encoded by the brain specific transcript 464 by M. Neuner-Jehle. In 1996, 6 rats were tested using affinity-purified polyclonal rabbit anti-dendrin antibodies. Using this technique two different proteins were identified one of which was dendrin. Dendrin expression was measured in sleep deprived rats and in control rats. Neuner-Jehle found that when the rats were sleep deprived, dendrin levels decreased. Neuner-Jehle also studied the location of dendrin expression by staining brain sections and was able to show the areas that were richest with dendrin. Most notably, the greatest protein was found in the forebrain and hippocampus. After this initial study, it was assumed that dendrin was located only in the brain. However, in 2006, Kawata et al. found that the dendrin protein is also located in the kidneys. A yeast two-hybrid screening of kidney cDNA proved to find dendrin in the kidney podocytes, where it connects to cytoskeleton proteins: S-S-SCAM and CIN85.

== Location ==
Dendrin is expressed in the forebrain (pictured in red above and in the hippocampus of the brain

It is now known that dendrin is found in the brain and kidneys, but it is not expressed everywhere in these two organs. Dendrin has only been found in a very specific part of the brain and specific parts of the kidneys. Within the brain, dendrin is normally found in the forebrain and hippocampus and in the kidneys, dendrin is normally found in the slit diaphragm and podocytes. It is believed that the location of this protein may directly affect its function, both in the brain and in the kidneys.

=== Brain ===
Dendrin is a postsynaptic protein that is found in the forebrain and hippocampus. Specifically in the forebrain, dendrin is found in the cerebral cortex and the subcortical forebrain plus midbrain areas (SFMA). Dendrin has yet to be found in other parts of the brain, but is very abundant in the parts of the brain where it is known to be expressed. Within these known locations in the brain, dendrin is associated with the actin cytoskeleton. Dendrin is found in the neuron's cell body and its dendrites. This is the part of the cell that helps it to retain its structure and move other molecules throughout the cell. MAGI/S-SCAM is a component of the cytoskeleton that is used to keep dendrin in the cytoplasm of a neuron, and prevents the protein from diffusing into the nucleus. Because of this location in the neuron, it is thought that dendrin is involved in retrograde signaling from the synapse to the nucleus. This form of signaling is the reverse of normal neural signaling so that instead of the signal passing from the nucleus to the synapse, is passes from the synapse to the nucleus.

=== Kidneys ===
Renal corpuscle showing the podocytes, where dendrin is located in the kidneys

Dendrin is also expressed during mouse glomerulogenesis. The protein is usually expressed during the early capillary loop stage of glomerulogenesis and creates a linear pattern on the epithelial side of these loops. In normal mature kidneys, dendrin is found only in the podocytes near the slit diaphragm. Podocytes are epithelia cells in the kidneys that do not readily divide and act as a barrier that prevent urinary protein loss. Dendrin interacts with S-SCAM (used in organization of synapses) and CIN85, two scaffold proteins in the kidneys. Within this organ, dendrin's functions include the prevention of urinary protein loss and the formation of protein-protein interaction webs at dendritic spines.

==== Slit diaphragm ====
The slit diaphragm is a part of the kidneys that regulates renal ultrafiltration. Specifically, it is a part of the glomerular filter, which separates blood from urine. The slit diaphragm is very thin molecular sheet that mainly filters out plasma proteins and separates the glomerular podocyte foot processes. The slit diaphragm is attached to the actin cytoskeleton of the cell. Dendrin associates regularly with the slit diaphragm because the dendrin protein is located in these podocytes.

== Function ==
Although the exact function of dendrin is not known, there is a great deal of data to show what processes it contributes to and potentially regulates. Dendrin is normally affected by different behaviors. Most commonly studied in rats, dendrin is known to decrease with prolonged sleep deprivation and increase with acute nicotine intake. Within the brain, dendrin interacts with α-actinin in postsynaptic dendritic spines. Together MAGI/S-SCAM, α-actinin, and dendrin form a tertiary complex at postsynaptic neural sites. This trio of proteins helps to connect a dense filamentous lattice (postsynaptic density or PSD) to the cytoskeleton of the spine and is also linked to synaptic plasticity and memory formation. Additionally, the protein binds to nephrin and CD2AP within the kidneys, where can help with intracellular signaling pathways. In conjunction with the slit diaphragm, dendrin helps to prevent urinary protein loss.

=== Sleep deprivation effect on dendrin ===
When dendrin was originally discovered, it was associated with sleep deprivation. Lack of sleep causes a decrease in dendrin mRNA concentrations even after only 24 hours of no sleep. There is a slight increase in dendrin mRNA in the hippocampus caused by sleep deprivation although it is very minimal. Within the cerebral cortex, dendrin mRNA concentrations remain unchanged. Even though some dendrin levels in the brain rise or remain unchanged when sleep deprivation occurs, overall the levels of dendrin decrease. Through multiple studies it was found that there is a correlation between the levels of dendrin and sleep deprivation. Since it is still not clear what role dendrin plays in the brain, it is unclear how the processes dendrin is involved in are affected by lack of sleep.

=== Nicotine effect on dendrin ===
Even a small amount of nicotine (pictured above) can have an effect on dendrin levels.

Dendrin mRNA levels are increased with nicotine use in adolescent rat brains; however, these same levels of protein do not change in adults rats. It has also been shown that dendrin expression is not altered by cocaine or by placing the subject in a new or different environment. The proteins that dendrin typically associates with tend to be proteins that are linked to synaptic modification and learning. Expression of dendrin with even a small amount of nicotine could alter these processes and functions. Increased expression of dendrin caused by nicotine use is found mostly in the forebrain region of rats. Additional increase in dendrin mRNA is also found in the striatum.

=== Synaptic plasticity ===
The protein trio of MAGI/S-SCAM, α-actinin, and dendrin helps to connect postsynaptic density (PSD) to the cytoskeleton of the spine. The spatially restricted synthesis of dendrin contributes to the regulation of the synaptic cytoskeleton. The postsynaptic cytoskeleton, in turn, is involved in synaptic plasticity and memory formation suggesting that dendrin expression plays a role in these two brain functions. If the synapse is damaged, this protein trio may play a role in its ability to regain function or the synaptic function to be taken over by another part of the brain. The involvement of dendrin in memory formation also suggests that external influences like sleep deprivation or nicotine consumption can alter or affect how memories are formed or stored.

== Regulation of dendrin ==
Down-regulation of dendrin is due to sleep deprivation which reduces the numbers of dendrin in the neuron. Sleep deprivation causes the most notable regulation and while it does not cause a decrease in dendrin mRNA and protein everywhere in the brain, the most significant change in dendrin levels is an overall decrease. Dendrin is regulated in the kidneys by CD2AP, which assists in dendrin movement to the nucleus of the podocyte. This movement mainly occurs when an injury, or cell death occurs in the podocyte epithelial cells.

== Injury in the kidneys ==
When there is glomerular injury in the kidneys, the dendrin protein relocates to the podocyte nucleus in the slit diaphragm. The movement of this protein to the podocyte is associated with podocyte apoptosis. There is proof that the action of a podocyte cell killing itself causes dendrin to move to the nucleus. Damage to the podocytes causes the silt diaphragm to collapse and tight junctions, or cell to cell connections to be formed. It has been shown that dendrin is involved in promoting apoptosis of the podocytes. Apoptosis leads to a decrease in podocyte epithelial cells which causes proteinuria and could culminate in glomerulosclerosis. This relocation of dendrin can potentially help to diagnose any kidney damage or kidney disease. Dendrin locations in the kidneys can help determine the stage of glomerulosclerosis and how many podocytes have been lost to apoptosis.
