= NBR1 =

Protein-coding gene in the species Homo sapiens

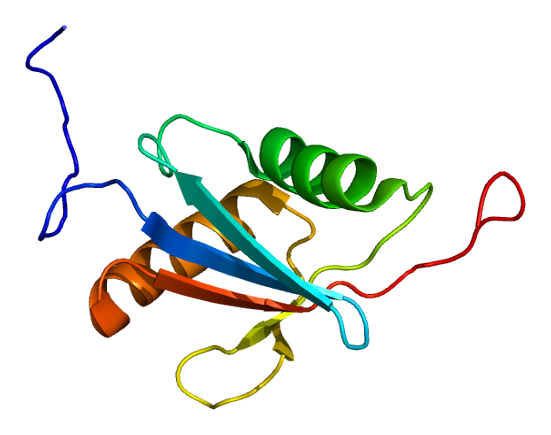

Identifiers
- Aliases: NBR1, 1A1-3B, IAI3B, M17S2, MIG19, neighbor of BRCA1 gene 1, autophagy cargo receptor, NBR1 autophagy cargo receptor
- External IDs: OMIM: 166945; MGI: 108498; GeneCards: NBR1
Available structures
PDB	Ortholog search: PDBe RCSB
PDB	List of PDB id codes 1WJ6, 2BKF, 2CP8, 2G4S, 2L8J, 2MGW, 2MJ5, 4OLE

Gene location (Human)
Chr.	Chromosome 17 (human)
Band	17q21.31	Start	43,170,481 bp
Band	17q21.31	End	43,211,689 bp

Gene location (Mouse)
Chr.	Chromosome 11 (mouse)
Band	11 D|11 65.36 cM	Start	101,442,975 bp
Band	11 D|11 65.36 cM	End	101,472,777 bp
RNA expression pattern
Bgee	Human / Mouse (ortholog); Top expressed in: tendon of biceps brachii; amniotic fluid; parietal pleura; epithelium of nasopharynx; germinal epithelium; Epithelium of choroid plexus; internal globus pallidus; jejunal mucosa; palpebral conjunctiva; visceral pleura / Top expressed in: ciliary body; retinal pigment epithelium; spermatid; seminiferous tubule; lacrimal gland; utricle; iris; pituitary gland; motor neuron; sciatic nerve; More reference expression data
BioGPS	n/a
Gene ontology
Molecular function	metal ion binding; zinc ion binding; protein binding; mitogen-activated protein kinase binding; ubiquitin binding
Cellular component	cytoplasm; M band; autophagosome; cytosol; late endosome; lysosome; extracellular exosome; membrane; cytoplasmic vesicle; phagophore assembly site; mitochondrion; nucleoplasm; nuclear body; intracellular membrane-bounded organelle
Biological process	protein complex oligomerization; negative regulation of osteoblast differentiation; regulation of stress-activated MAPK cascade; regulation of bone mineralization; macroautophagy
Sources:Amigo / QuickGO
Orthologs
Databases	NCBI: entry; OMA: entry
Species	Human	Mouse
Entrez	4077	17966
Ensembl	ENSG00000188554	ENSMUSG00000017119
UniProt	Q14596	P97432
RefSeq (mRNA)	NM_001291571; NM_001291572; NM_005899; NM_031858; NM_031862	NM_001252220; NM_001252222; NM_001252223; NM_008676
RefSeq (protein)	NP_001278500; NP_001278501; NP_005890; NP_114068	NP_001239149; NP_001239151; NP_001239152; NP_032702
Location (UCSC)	Chr 17: 43.17 – 43.21 Mb	Chr 11: 101.44 – 101.47 Mb
PubMed search
- Wikidata
View/Edit Human	View/Edit Mouse

Neighbor of BRCA1 gene 1 protein is a protein that in humans is encoded by the NBR1 gene.

The protein encoded by this gene was originally identified as an ovarian tumor antigen monitored in ovarian cancer. The encoded protein contains a B-box/coiled coil motif, which is present in many genes with transformation potential. This gene is located on a region of chromosome 17q21.1 that is in close proximity to tumor suppressor gene BRCA1. Three alternatively spliced variants encoding the same protein have been identified for this gene. One implied function lies in autophagy, where it acts a cargo receptor in selective autophagy.

== Interactions ==
NBR1 has been shown to interact with FEZ1.
