= PRKCI =

Protein-coding gene in the species Homo sapiens

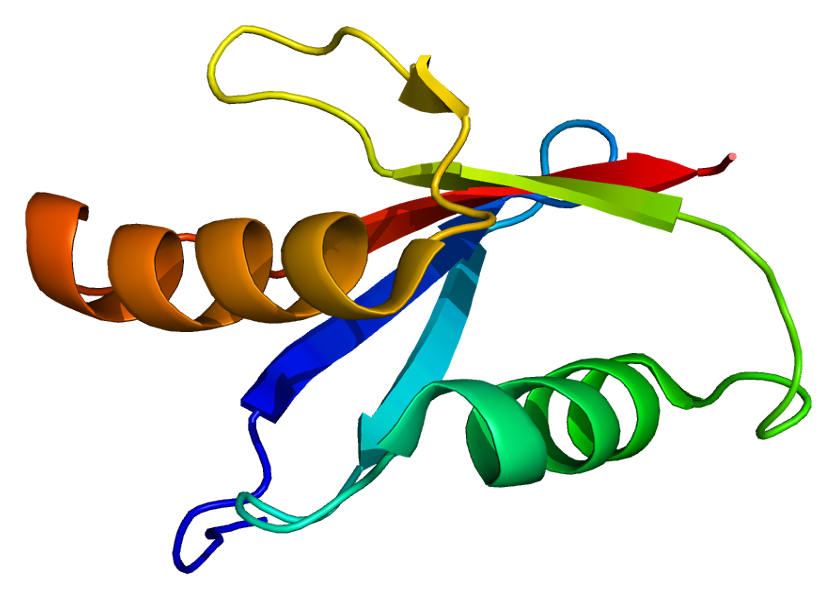

Identifiers
- Aliases: PRKCI, DXS1179E, PKCI, nPKC-iota, protein kinase C iota
- External IDs: OMIM: 600539; MGI: 99260; GeneCards: PRKCI
Available structures
PDB	Ortholog search: PDBe RCSB
PDB	List of PDB id codes 1VD2, 1WMH, 1ZRZ, 3A8W, 3A8X, 3ZH8
Enzyme activity
EC #	BRENDA	ExPASy	KEGG	MetaCyc
2.7.11.13	↗	↗	↗	↗

Gene location (Human)
Chr.	Chromosome 3 (human)
Band	3q26.2	Start	170,222,424 bp
Band	3q26.2	End	170,305,977 bp

Gene location (Mouse)
Chr.	Chromosome 3 (mouse)
Band	3 A3|3 14.65 cM	Start	31,049,896 bp
Band	3 A3|3 14.65 cM	End	31,107,108 bp
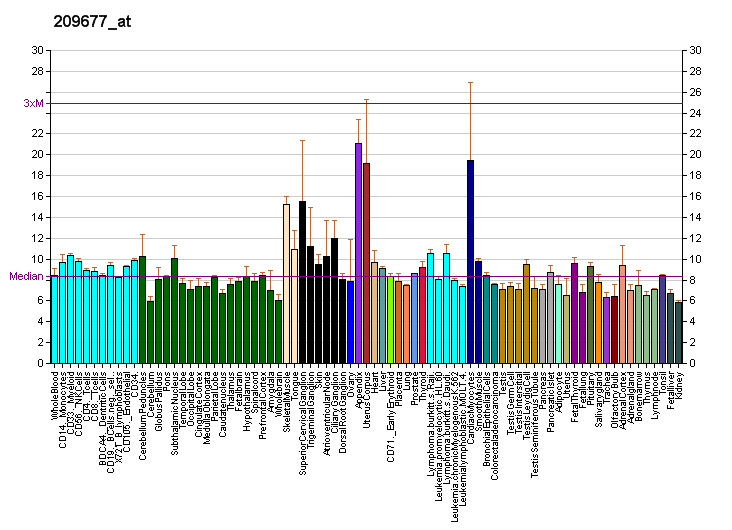

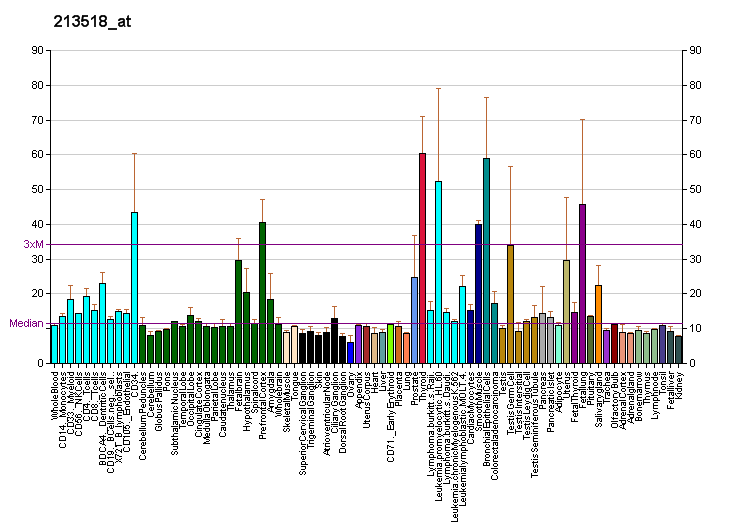

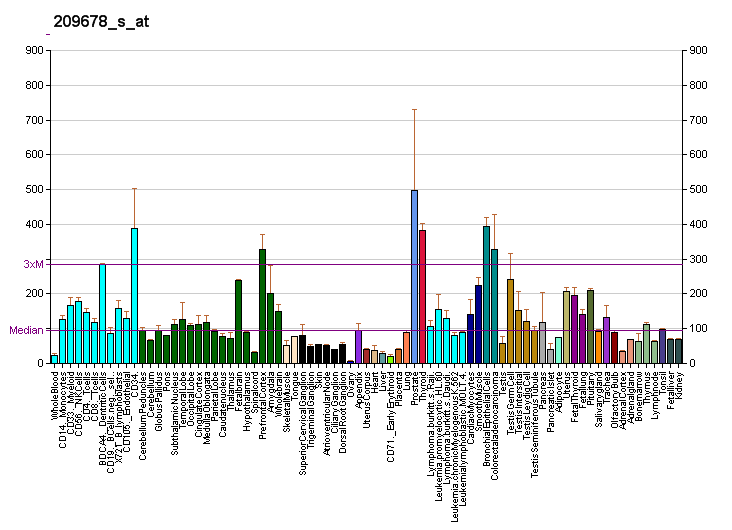
RNA expression pattern
Bgee	Human / Mouse (ortholog); Top expressed in: buccal mucosa cell; pylorus; lower lobe of lung; corpus epididymis; cardia; oral cavity; renal medulla; mucosa of pharynx; nipple; palpebral conjunctiva / Top expressed in: molar; ciliary body; urothelium; hair follicle; iris; conjunctival fornix; transitional epithelium of urinary bladder; epithelium of lens; primitive streak; ureter; More reference expression data
BioGPS	More reference expression data
Gene ontology
Molecular function	transferase activity; protein kinase activity; nucleotide binding; protein kinase C activity; protein domain specific binding; metal ion binding; kinase activity; protein serine/threonine kinase activity; protein binding; phospholipid binding; ATP binding
Cellular component	cytosol; endosome; membrane; bicellular tight junction; microtubule cytoskeleton; Golgi membrane; plasma membrane; apical part of cell; Schmidt-Lanterman incisure; apical plasma membrane; cell leading edge; intercellular bridge; extracellular exosome; nucleus; cytoplasm; nucleoplasm; protein-containing complex; Schaffer collateral - CA1 synapse; glutamatergic synapse
Biological process	negative regulation of neuron apoptotic process; positive regulation of glucose import; establishment of apical/basal cell polarity; intracellular signal transduction; response to interleukin-1; phosphorylation; Golgi vesicle budding; actin filament organization; protein targeting to membrane; negative regulation of glial cell apoptotic process; response to peptide hormone; negative regulation of apoptotic process; secretion; protein phosphorylation; positive regulation of endothelial cell apoptotic process; positive regulation of NF-kappaB transcription factor activity; cytoskeleton organization; establishment or maintenance of epithelial cell apical/basal polarity; bicellular tight junction assembly; positive regulation of neuron projection development; cellular response to insulin stimulus; eye photoreceptor cell development; membrane organization; positive regulation of glial cell proliferation; cell migration; vesicle-mediated transport; cell-cell junction organization; peptidyl-serine phosphorylation; positive regulation of protein localization to plasma membrane; positive regulation of Notch signaling pathway; regulation of postsynaptic membrane neurotransmitter receptor levels
Sources:Amigo / QuickGO
Orthologs
Databases	NCBI: entry; OMA: entry
Species	Human	Mouse
Entrez	5584	18759
Ensembl	ENSG00000163558	ENSMUSG00000037643
UniProt	P41743	Q62074
RefSeq (mRNA)	NM_002740	NM_008857
RefSeq (protein)	NP_002731	NP_032883
Location (UCSC)	Chr 3: 170.22 – 170.31 Mb	Chr 3: 31.05 – 31.11 Mb
PubMed search
- Wikidata
View/Edit Human	View/Edit Mouse

Protein kinase C iota type is an enzyme that in humans is encoded by the PRKCI gene.

== Function ==
This gene encodes a member of the protein kinase C (PKC) family of serine/threonine protein kinases. The PKC family comprises at least eight members, which are differentially expressed and are involved in a wide variety of cellular processes. This protein kinase is calcium-independent and phospholipid-dependent. It is not activated by phorbol esters or diacylglycerol. This kinase can be recruited to vesicle tubular clusters (VTCs) by direct interaction with the small GTPase RAB2, where this kinase phosphorylates glyceraldehyde-3-phosphate dehydrogenase (GAPD/GAPDH) and plays a role in microtubule dynamics in the early secretory pathway. This kinase is found to be necessary for BCL-ABL-mediated resistance to drug-induced apoptosis and therefore protects leukemia cells against drug-induced apoptosis. There is a single exon pseudogene mapped on chromosome X.

== Interactions ==
PRKCI has been shown to interact with:

- Centaurin, alpha 1,
- FRS2,
- Glyceraldehyde 3-phosphate dehydrogenase,
- PARD3,
- Phosphoinositide-dependent kinase-1,
- SMG1 (gene),
- Sequestosome 1,
- KRAS.
- Vimentin
