= FEZ2 =

Protein-coding gene in the species Homo sapiens

Identifiers
- Aliases: FEZ2, HUM3CL, fasciculation and elongation protein zeta 2
- External IDs: OMIM: 604826; MGI: 2675856; GeneCards: FEZ2

Gene location (Human)
Chr.	Chromosome 2 (human)
Band	2p22.2	Start	36,531,805 bp
Band	2p22.2	End	36,646,087 bp

Gene location (Mouse)
Chr.	Chromosome 17 (mouse)
Band	17 E2- E3|17 48.57 cM	Start	78,676,641 bp
Band	17 E2- E3|17 48.57 cM	End	78,725,581 bp
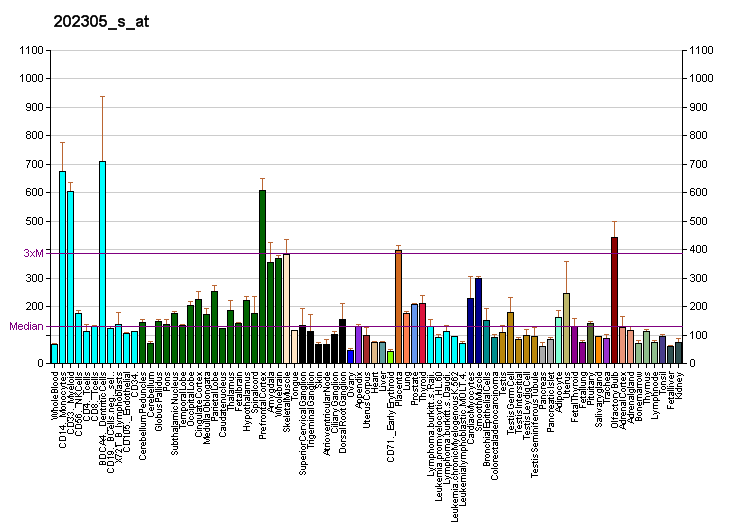

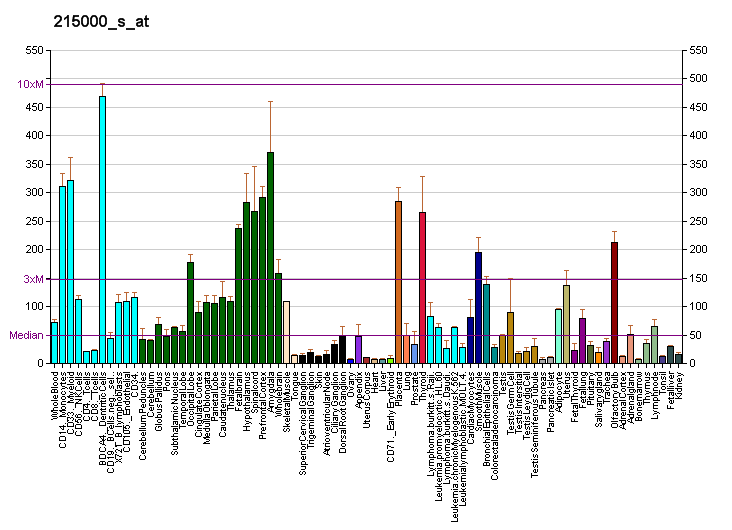
RNA expression pattern
Bgee	Human / Mouse (ortholog); Top expressed in: endothelial cell; secondary oocyte; Skeletal muscle tissue of rectus abdominis; Skeletal muscle tissue of biceps brachii; thoracic diaphragm; deltoid muscle; parietal pleura; muscle of thigh; visceral pleura; Brodmann area 23 / Top expressed in: epithelium of lens; sternocleidomastoid muscle; muscle of thigh; triceps brachii muscle; retinal pigment epithelium; right ventricle; temporal muscle; quadriceps femoris muscle; digastric muscle; gastrocnemius muscle; More reference expression data
BioGPS	More reference expression data
Gene ontology
Molecular function	protein binding
Cellular component	cytoplasm; axon
Biological process	signal transduction; nervous system development; negative regulation of autophagosome assembly; axon guidance
Sources:Amigo / QuickGO
Orthologs
Databases	NCBI: entry; OMA: entry
Species	Human	Mouse
Entrez	9637	225020
Ensembl	ENSG00000171055	ENSMUSG00000056121
UniProt	Q9UHY8	Q6TYB5
RefSeq (mRNA)	NM_001042548; NM_005102	NM_001285940; NM_001285946; NM_001285949; NM_199448; NM_001360407
RefSeq (protein)	NP_001036013; NP_005093	NP_001272869; NP_001272875; NP_001272878; NP_955519; NP_001347336
Location (UCSC)	Chr 2: 36.53 – 36.65 Mb	Chr 17: 78.68 – 78.73 Mb
PubMed search
- Wikidata
View/Edit Human	View/Edit Mouse

Fasciculation and elongation protein zeta-2 is a protein that in humans is encoded by the FEZ2 gene.

This gene is an ortholog of the C. elegans unc-76 gene, which is necessary for normal axonal bundling and elongation within axon bundles. Other orthologs include the rat gene that encodes zygin II, which can bind to synaptotagmin.

== Interactions ==
FEZ2 has been shown to interact with Protein kinase Mζ.
