= Consensus site =

Term in molecular biology

A consensus site is a term in molecular biology that refers to a site on a protein that is often modified in a particular way. Modifications may be N- or O- linked glycosylation, phosphorylation, tyrosine sulfation or other.
