= Fez (Frank Stella) =

1964 painting by Frank Stella

- Artist: Frank Stella
- Year: 1964
- Type: Contemporary art Modern art
- Medium: Fluorescent alkyd on canvas
- Dimensions: 195.6 cm × 195.6 cm (77.0 in × 77.0 in)
- Location: Albright-Knox Art Gallery; Buffalo

Fez is a 1964 painting by the modern artist Frank Stella. Multiple editions of the work exist, with one additionally in the collection of the Museum of Modern Art in New York.
