= FEZ1 =

Protein-coding gene in the species Homo sapiens

Identifiers
- Aliases: FEZ1, UNC-76, fasciculation and elongation protein zeta 1
- External IDs: OMIM: 604825; MGI: 2670976; GeneCards: FEZ1

Gene location (Human)
Chr.	Chromosome 11 (human)
Band	11q24.2	Start	125,442,881 bp
Band	11q24.2	End	125,592,568 bp

Gene location (Mouse)
Chr.	Chromosome 9 (mouse)
Band	9|9 A4	Start	36,733,160 bp
Band	9|9 A4	End	36,790,220 bp
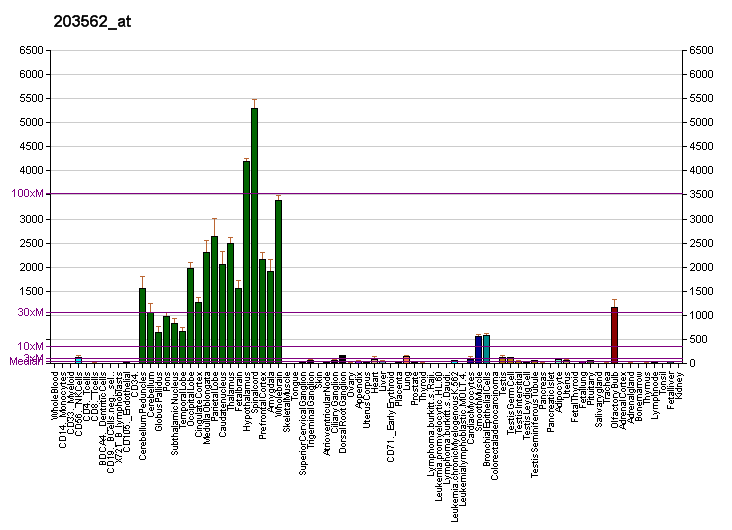
RNA expression pattern
Bgee	Human / Mouse (ortholog); Top expressed in: inferior olivary nucleus; C1 segment; inferior ganglion of vagus nerve; corpus callosum; middle frontal gyrus; subthalamic nucleus; prefrontal cortex; pons; dorsal motor nucleus of vagus nerve; substantia nigra / Top expressed in: deep cerebellar nuclei; globus pallidus; ventricular zone; lobe of cerebellum; cerebellar vermis; inferior colliculi; superior colliculus; lateral geniculate nucleus; ganglionic eminence; medulla oblongata; More reference expression data
BioGPS	More reference expression data
Gene ontology
Molecular function	protein binding; gamma-tubulin binding; protein kinase C binding; protein N-terminus binding
Cellular component	centrosome; Golgi apparatus; cell projection; membrane; plasma membrane; microtubule organizing center; dendrite; mitochondrion; microtubule; cytoskeleton; cytoplasm; axon; growth cone; soma; microtubule cytoskeleton
Biological process	negative regulation of autophagosome assembly; cellular response to growth factor stimulus; nervous system development; axon guidance; cell adhesion; establishment of mitochondrion localization; positive regulation of neuron differentiation; positive regulation of neuron projection development; hippocampus development; establishment of cell polarity; positive regulation of anterograde axonal transport of mitochondrion; mitochondrion morphogenesis
Sources:Amigo / QuickGO
Orthologs
Databases	NCBI: entry; OMA: entry
Species	Human	Mouse
Entrez	9638	235180
Ensembl	ENSG00000149557	ENSMUSG00000032118
UniProt	Q99689	Q8K0X8
RefSeq (mRNA)	NM_005103; NM_022549	NM_183171; NM_001357610; NM_001357611; NM_001357612; NM_001357613 NM_001357614
RefSeq (protein)	NP_005094; NP_072043	NP_898994; NP_001344539; NP_001344540; NP_001344541; NP_001344542 NP_001344543
Location (UCSC)	Chr 11: 125.44 – 125.59 Mb	Chr 9: 36.73 – 36.79 Mb
PubMed search
- Wikidata
View/Edit Human	View/Edit Mouse

Fasciculation and elongation protein zeta-1 is a protein that in humans is encoded by the FEZ1 gene.

This gene is an ortholog of the C. elegans unc-76 gene, which is necessary for normal axonal bundling and elongation within axon bundles. Expression of this gene in C. elegans unc-76 mutants can restore to the mutants partial locomotion and axonal fasciculation, suggesting that it also functions in axonal outgrowth. The N-terminal half of the gene product is highly acidic. Alternatively spliced transcript variants encoding different isoforms of this protein have been described.

This protein is present in neurons, and it is believed to block the process of infection of these cells by HIV.

== Interactions ==
FEZ1 has been shown to interact with Protein kinase Mζ, NBR1 and DISC1.
