= Gap-43 protein =

Protein-coding gene in the species Homo sapiens

GAP43
Available structures
PDB	Ortholog search: PDBe RCSB
PDB	List of PDB id codes 4E53

Identifiers
- Aliases: GAP43, B-50, PP46, growth associated protein 43, GAP-43
- External IDs: OMIM: 162060; MGI: 95639; HomoloGene: 1545; GeneCards: GAP43; OMA:GAP43 - orthologs

Gene location (Human)
Chr.	Chromosome 3 (human)
Band	3q13.31	Start	115,623,510 bp
Band	3q13.31	End	115,721,490 bp

Gene location (Mouse)
Chr.	Chromosome 16 (mouse)
Band	16 B4|16 28.37 cM	Start	42,068,805 bp
Band	16 B4|16 28.37 cM	End	42,161,014 bp
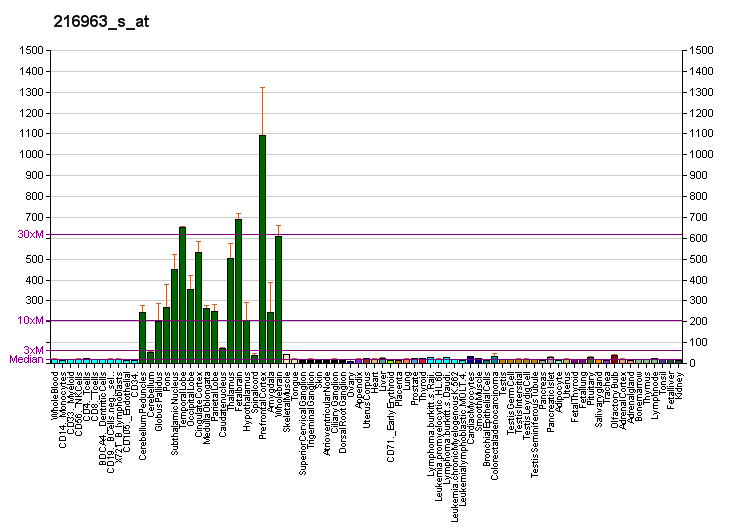

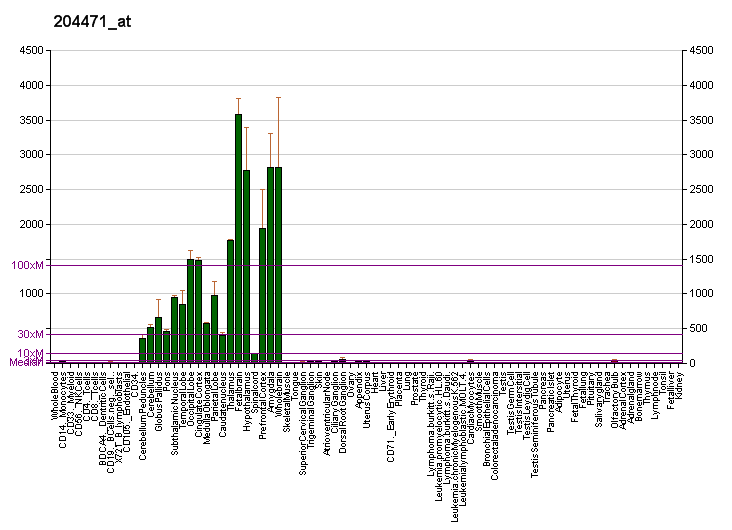
RNA expression pattern
Bgee	Human / Mouse (ortholog); Top expressed in: Brodmann area 10; frontal pole; Brodmann area 23; right frontal lobe; dorsolateral prefrontal cortex; superior frontal gyrus; orbitofrontal cortex; Brodmann area 9; cingulate gyrus; anterior cingulate cortex / Top expressed in: superior cervical ganglion; ventromedial nucleus; ventral tegmental area; lateral hypothalamus; lateral septal nucleus; anterior amygdaloid area; paraventricular nucleus of hypothalamus; dorsomedial hypothalamic nucleus; arcuate nucleus; nucleus of stria terminalis; More reference expression data
BioGPS	More reference expression data
Gene ontology
Molecular function	lysophosphatidic acid binding; phosphatidylinositol phosphate binding; phosphatidylserine binding; calmodulin binding; protein binding
Cellular component	cytoplasm; cell projection; membrane; postsynaptic density; growth cone membrane; synapse; axon; cell junction; cell periphery; filopodium membrane; plasma membrane; GABA-ergic synapse
Biological process	regulation of filopodium assembly; cell differentiation; cell fate commitment; tissue regeneration; glial cell differentiation; nervous system development; multicellular organism development; protein kinase C-activating G protein-coupled receptor signaling pathway; response to wounding; regulation of growth; axon choice point recognition; axon development; axon guidance; regulation of postsynaptic specialization assembly; axon regeneration
Sources:Amigo / QuickGO
Orthologs
Species	Human	Mouse
Entrez	2596	14432
Ensembl	ENSG00000172020	ENSMUSG00000047261
UniProt	P17677	P06837
RefSeq (mRNA)	NM_002045; NM_001130064	NM_008083
RefSeq (protein)	NP_001123536; NP_002036	NP_032109
Location (UCSC)	Chr 3: 115.62 – 115.72 Mb	Chr 16: 42.07 – 42.16 Mb
PubMed search
- Wikidata
View/Edit Human	View/Edit Mouse

Growth Associated Protein 43 (GAP43, Neuromodulin) is a protein encoded by the GAP43 gene in humans.

GAP43 is called a "growth" or "plasticity" protein because it is expressed at high levels in neuronal growth cones during development and axonal regeneration, and it is phosphorylated after long-term potentiation and after learning.

GAP43 is a crucial component of the axon and presynaptic terminal. Its null mutation leads to death within days after birth, due to axon pathfinding defects.

== Synonyms ==
GAP43 is also referred to as:

- protein F1
- neuromodulin
- neural phosphoprotein B-50
- axonal membrane protein GAP-43
- calmodulin-binding protein P-57
- nerve growth-related peptide GAP43
- neuron growth-associated protein 43

== Function ==
GAP43, is a cytoplasmic protein that can be attached to the membrane via a dual palmitoylation sequence on cysteines 3 and 4. This sequence targets GAP43 to lipid rafts. It is a major protein kinase C (PKC) substrate and is considered to play a key role in neurite formation, regeneration, and plasticity. The role of GAP-43 in CNS development is not limited to effects on axons: It is also a component of the centrosome, and differentiating neurons that do not express GAP-43 show mislocalization of the centrosome and mitotic spindles, particularly in neurogenic cell divisions. As a consequence, in the cerebellum, the neuronal precursor pool fails to expand normally and the cerebellum is significantly smaller.

Several different laboratories studying the same protein, now called GAP43, initially used different names. It was designated F1, then B-50, then GAP43, pp46, and finally neuromodulin, each name reflecting a different function of the same molecule. F1 was localized to synapses, and was increased in its phosphorylation one day after learning. However, F1 was not cAMP kinase dependent. B-50 was regulated by the pituitary peptide ACTH and was associated with grooming behavior. In the case of GAP-43, it was designated as a growth-associated protein because its synthesis was upregulated during axonal regeneration. Pp46 was concentrated in neuronal growth cones and was thus postulated to play an important role in brain development. In the case of neuromodulin, it was shown to bind calmodulin avidly.

GAP43, the consensus choice for its designation, is a protein that is attached to the membrane via a dual palmitoylation sequence on cysteines 3 and 4, though it can exist in the non-bound form in the cytoplasm. This dual sequence enables the association of phosphatidylinositol 4,5-bisphosphate (PIP_{2}), with actin, facilitating the latter's polymerization thereby regulating cell structure. This can occur within a lipid raft so as to compartmentalize and localize motility of filopodia in growth cones in developing brains, and could also remodel presynaptic terminals in adults in an activity-dependent manner. GAP-43 is also a protein kinase C (PKC) substrate. Phosphorylation of serine-41 on GAP-43 by PKC regulates neurite formation, regeneration, and synaptic plasticity.

Because of the association and potential binding of GAP43 with a number of different molecules, including PKC, PIP_{2}, actin, calmodulin, spectrin, palmitate, synaptophysin, amyloid and tau protein, it may be useful to think of GAP43 as an adaptor protein situated within the terminal in a supramolecular complex regulating presynaptic terminal functions, particularly bidirectional communication with the postsynaptic process. Its important role in memory and information storage is executed through its cell biological mechanisms of phosphorylation, palmitoylation, protein-protein interaction and structural remodeling via actin polymerization.

== Clinical significance ==
Humans with a deletion in one allele of the GAP43 gene fail to form telencephalic commissures and are intellectually disabled.
