= Acclimatisation (neurons) =

Phenomenon in nervous system response

Acclimatisation is the process by which the nervous system fails to respond to a stimulus, as a result of the repeated stimulation of a transmission across a synapse. Acclimatisation is believed to occur when the synaptic knob of the presynaptic neuron runs out of vesicles containing neurotransmitters due to overuse over a short period of time. A synapse that has undergone acclimatisation is said to be fatigued.

Acclimatisation is said to be responsible for 'getting used to' background noises and smells.

== See also ==
- Adaptive system
- Neural adaptation
