= Homosynaptic plasticity =

Type of synaptic plasticity

Homosynaptic plasticity is one type of synaptic plasticity. Homosynaptic plasticity is input-specific, meaning changes in synapse strength occur only at post-synaptic targets specifically stimulated by a pre-synaptic target. Therefore, the spread of the signal from the pre-synaptic cell is localized.

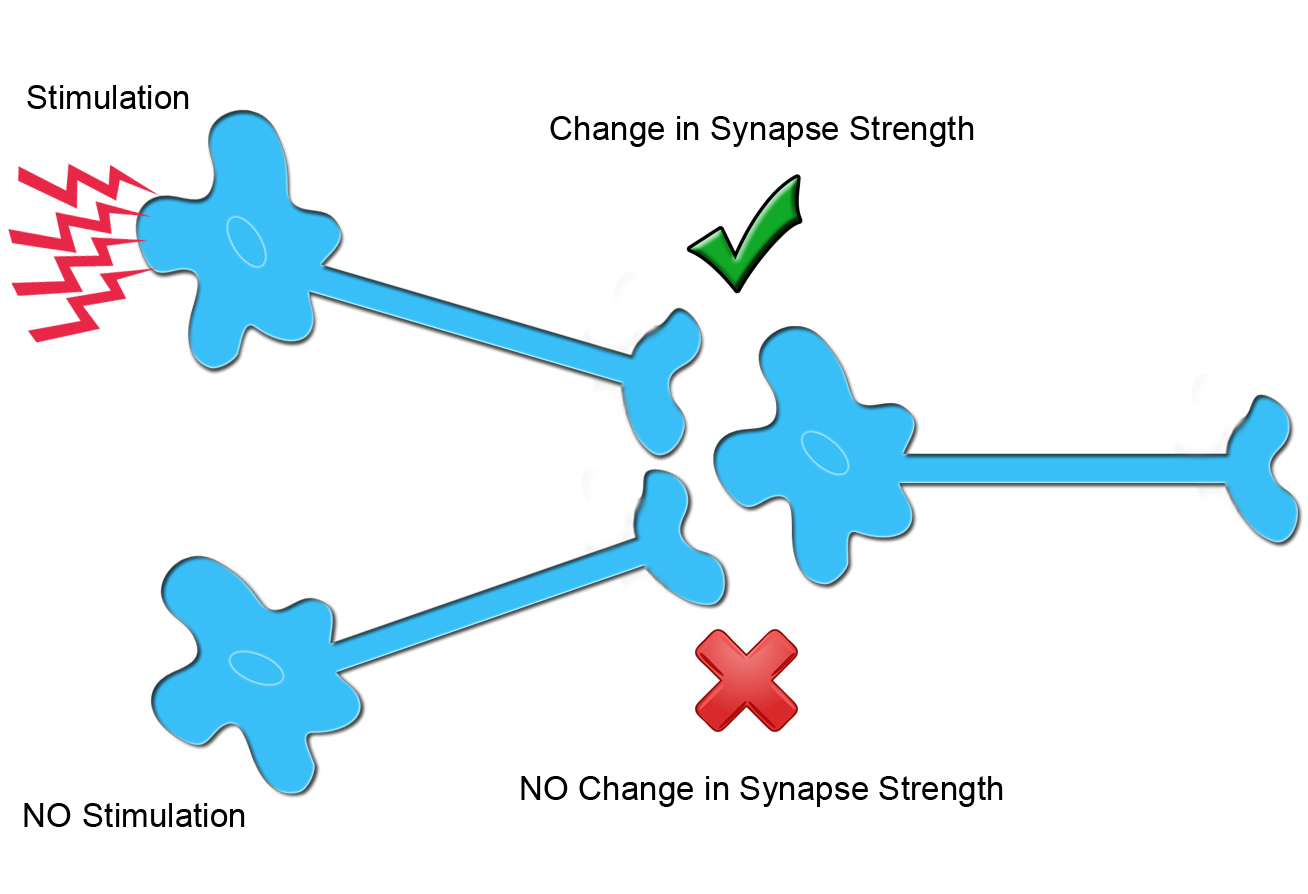
In homosynaptic plasticity, only neurons that are specifically innervated undergo changes in synaptic plasticity

Another type of synaptic plasticity, heterosynaptic plasticity, is not input-specific and differs from homosynaptic plasticity in many mechanisms.

In addition to being input-specific, the strengthening of a synapse via homosynaptic plasticity is associative, because it is dependent on the firing of a presynaptic and postsynaptic neuron closely in time. This associativity increases the chances that the postsynaptic neuron will also fire. These mechanisms are theorized to underlie learning and short-term memory.

== Overview ==
=== Hebb's postulate ===
Donald Hebb theorized that strengthening of synaptic connections occurred because of coordinated activity between the pre-synaptic terminal and post-synaptic dendrite. According to Hebb, these two cells are strengthened because their signaling occurs together in space and/or time, also known as coincident activity. This postulate is often summarized as Cells that fire together, wire together, which means that the synapses that have neurons with coincident firing are strengthened, while the other synapses on these neurons remain unchanged. Hebb's postulate has provided a conceptual framework for how synaptic plasticity underlies long-term information storage. Spike-timing-dependent plasticity (STDP), where a presynaptic neuron firing just milliseconds before a postsynaptic neuron leads to synaptic strengthening (timing-based long-term potentiation LTP), while firing after the postsynaptic neuron causes weakening (timing-based long-term depression LTD). This temporal rule refines Hebb's postulate by adding a time dimension to input-specific plasticity, highlighting that not just simultaneous activity but the order of spikes can determine whether a connection is potentiated or depressed.

=== Mechanisms for input-specificity ===
Changes in plasticity often occurs via the insertion or internalization of AMPA receptors (AMPARs) into the postsynaptic membrane of the synapse undergoing a change in connective strength. Ca^{2+} is one signaling ion that causes this AMPA receptor density change by inducing a cascade of biological changes within the cell. To induce long-term potentiation (LTP), Ca^{2+} activates CAMKII and PKC, causing phosphorylation and insertion of AMPARs, while long-term depression (LTD) occurs by Ca^{2+} activating protein phosphatases, which dephosphorylate and cause internalization of AMPARs.

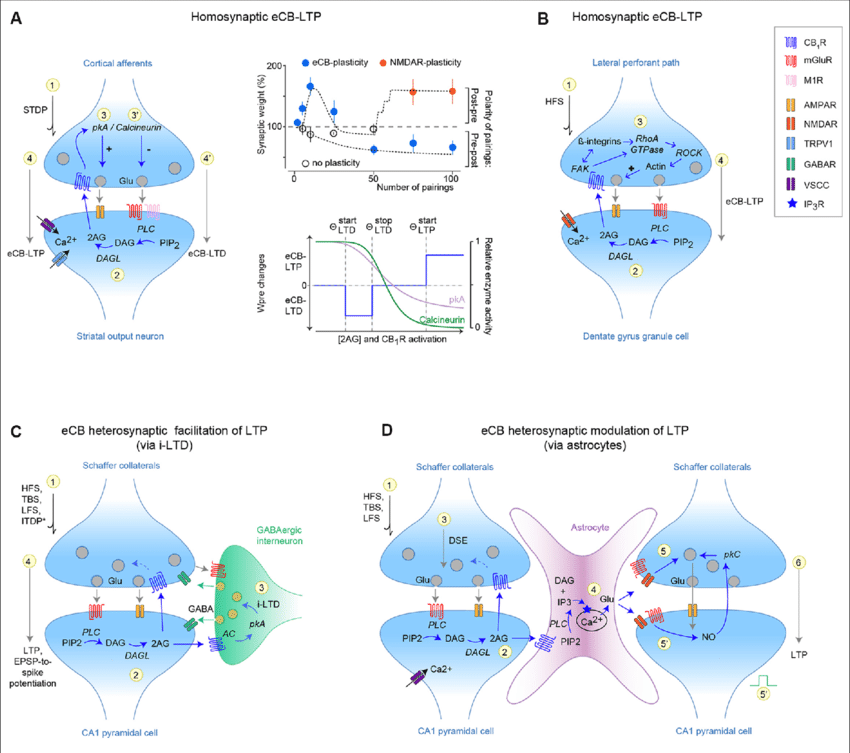
Endocannabinoids released from the postsynaptic neuron can modulate synaptic strength. In homosynaptic plasticity, effects are limited to the activated synapse, while in heterosynaptic plasticity, signaling spreads to nearby synapses.

In order to create input-specific changes in synaptic strength, the Ca^{2+} signal must be restricted to specific dendritic spines. Dendritic restriction of Ca^{2+} is mediated by several mechanisms. Extracellular Ca^{2+} can enter the spine through NMDA receptors (NMDARs) and voltage gated Ca^{2+} channels (VGCCs). Both NMDARs and VGCCs are concentrated on dendritic spines, mediating spine specific Ca^{2+} influx. Intracellular stores of Ca^{2+} in the endoplasmic reticulum and mitochondria may also contribute to spine restricted signaling, although some studies have failed to find evidence for this. Clearance of Ca^{2+} is controlled by buffer proteins, which bind to Ca^{2+} and keep it from trickling out to other spines. Restricted diffusion of Ca^{2+} across the neck of the dendritic spine also helps isolate it to specific dendrites.

Another mechanism for input-specific long-term potentiation is temporal. NMDARs require both depolarization, to remove their magnesium block, and glutamate activation, to open their channels, to allow Ca^{2+} influx. LTP is thus localized at sites where NMDA channels are opened by active synaptic inputs that are releasing glutamate and causing depolarization of the postsynaptic cell, and will not affect nearby inactive synapses.

=== Homosynaptic Plasticity in Learning and Memory ===
Homosynaptic plasticity is a crucial mechanism that enables the brain to refine synaptic strength in response to experience, playing a fundamental role in learning and memory. This process ensures that frequently activated neural pathways are strengthened while less relevant connections weaken, thereby optimizing memory storage and retrieval. Within the corticohippocampal circuit, homosynaptic plasticity helps regulate information flow between the entorhinal cortex (EC) and hippocampus, two regions essential for encoding, consolidating, and recalling memories. The synaptic plasticity and memory (SPM) hypothesis suggests that memory formation relies on experience-driven synaptic modifications. Research has shown that alterations in synaptic strength, particularly through long-term potentiation (LTP) and long-term depression (LTD), directly impact learning capacity. LTP reinforces neural pathways by enhancing synaptic efficiency, making it easier for neurons to communicate and retain learned information. Conversely, LTD weakens less-used connections, allowing for the elimination of outdated or irrelevant information, which prevents cognitive overload and supports adaptive learning.

== Maintaining Long-Term Changes ==
In order to stabilize LTP and make it last longer periods of time, new proteins supporting this change are synthesized in response to stimulation at a potentiating synapse. The challenge that arises is how to get specific, newly synthesized proteins to the correct input-specific synapses at which they are needed. Two solutions to this problem include synaptic tagging and local protein synthesis. However, before long-term changes can take effect, short-term mechanisms like post-tetanic potentiation (PTP).

=== Post-tetanic potentiation (PTP) ===
Post-tetanic potentiation (PTP) is a temporary enhancement of synaptic strength that occurs following a burst of high-frequency stimulation. This effect can last for several minutes and is believed to be driven by an accumulation of calcium ions in the presynaptic terminal. The elevated calcium levels increase the likelihood of neurotransmitter release, making synaptic transmission more effective during this period. PTP is considered a short-term plasticity mechanism that helps reinforce neural signaling in response to repeated stimulation.

=== Synaptic Tagging ===
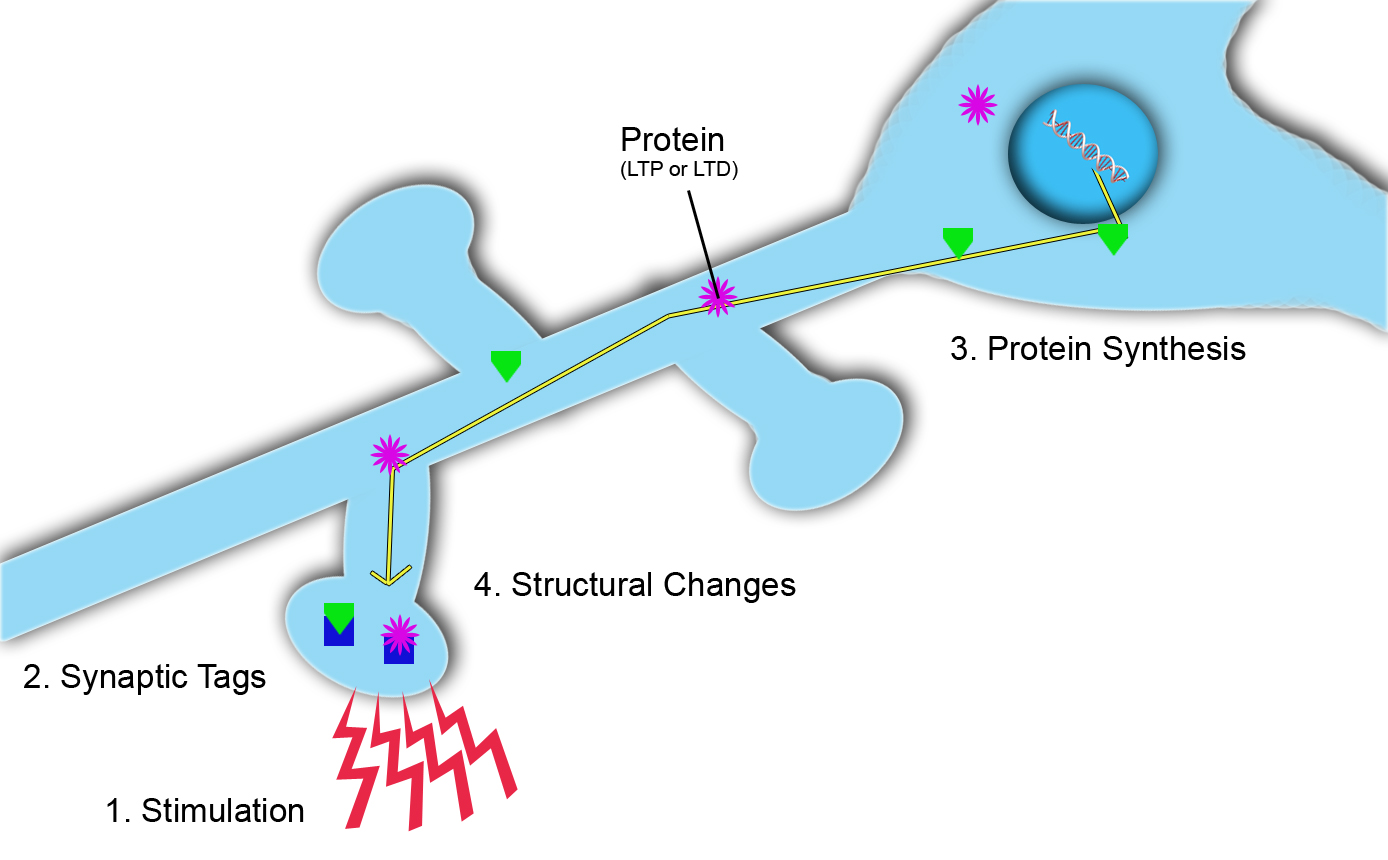
In a neuron, synaptic tagging occurs in a series of steps in order to provide information on synaptic plasticity.

Synaptic tags mark where synaptic plasticity has occurred and can thus provide information on synaptic strength and potential for long-term plastic changes. The tag is temporary and involves a large number of proteins, activated by the influx of Ca^{2+} into the postsynaptic cell. In addition, depending on the type and magnitude of synaptic change, different proteins are used for tagging. For example, when plastic changes lead to long-term depression, calcineurin is used. Conversely, when plasticity leads to long-term potentiation, CaMKII is used. In order for synaptic plasticity to be input-specific, these synaptic tags are essential on post-synaptic targets, to ensure synaptic potentiation is localized. These tags will later initiate protein synthesis that will in turn cause synaptic plasticity changes at these activated neurons.

=== Local Protein Synthesis ===
Protein synthesis at dendrites is necessary for homosynaptic plasticity. The depolarization and resulting activation of AMPA and NMDA receptors in the postsynaptic cell causes endocytosis of these receptors. Local protein synthesis is required to maintain the number of surface receptors at the synapse. These new proteins help stabilize the structural changes induced by homosynaptic plasticity. There is evidence of ribosomes in dendrites, which can manufacture these proteins. Furthermore, there is also evidence of granules of RNA in dendrites, which indicates the presence of newly made proteins. LTP can be induced from dendrites severed from the soma of the post-synaptic target neuron. Contrarily, LTP can be blocked in these dendrites by protein synthesis blockers, such as Endomyacin, which further indicates a site for local protein synthesis. This evidence shows local protein synthesis is necessary for L-LTP to be stabilized and maintained.

=== Structural Remodeling in Homosynaptic Plasticity ===
During homosynaptic LTP, dendritic spines (the tiny protrusions where synapses occur) often enlarge or new spines form, strengthening the synaptic contact. Imaging studies have shown, for example, that a potentiated synapse can exhibit spine growth, whereas non-stimulated neighboring synapses might shrink These structural modifications help lock in the functional changes, making the potentiation more durable.

== Homosynaptic Plasticity and Age ==
=== Neural Development ===
Early in life, the brain produces an excess of synaptic connections and then prunes them back based on experience. Active synapses are homosynaptically strengthened while inactive ones are weakened or eliminated, following a "use-it-or-lose-it" principle. This activity-driven refinement is crucial during critical periods – windows of heightened plasticity in childhood when sensory systems and cognitive functions are tuned.

=== Decline of Homosynaptic Plasticity in Older Adults ===
The capacity for homosynaptic plasticity (like the ease of inducing LTP or LTD) tends to decline in older adults. This decline is linked to slower learning and memory impairments with age, as the brain becomes less flexible in re-wiring itself. Age-related conditions—such as Alzheimer's disease—are associated with impaired synaptic plasticity mechanisms, suggesting that maintaining robust homosynaptic plasticity might protect cognitive function.

== Pharmaceutical Applications and Therapeutic Potential ==
Homosynaptic plasticity has become a key focus in the development of new therapies for brain disorders, particularly neurodegenerative and psychiatric conditions. In Alzheimer's and Parkinson's diseases, pathological changes such as amyloid-β accumulation or loss of dopaminergic neurons can disrupt normal homosynaptic long-term potentiation, contributing to cognitive or motor deficits. Accordingly, emerging drug strategies aim to restore synaptic function by enhancing activity-dependent synaptic plasticity or preventing synapse loss in these disorders. Similarly, aberrant synaptic connectivity in mood and psychotic disorders is being targeted by novel treatments. For example, rapid-acting antidepressants like ketamine produce lasting antidepressant effects by quickly reversing stress-induced synaptic atrophy and strengthening synaptic connections, while glutamatergic modulators (affecting NMDA-type receptors) are under investigation to boost homosynaptic plasticity and improve cognitive function in schizophrenia.
