= Synaptic plasticity =

Ability of a synapse to strengthen or weaken over time according to its activity

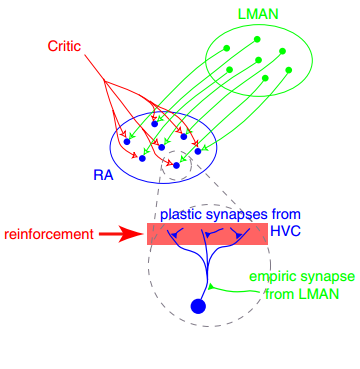
Synaptic plasticity rule for gradient estimation by dynamic perturbation of conductances

In neuroscience, synaptic plasticity is the ability of synapses to strengthen or weaken over time, in response to increases or decreases in their activity. Since memories are postulated to be represented by vastly interconnected neural circuits in the brain, synaptic plasticity is one of the important neurochemical foundations of learning and memory (see Hebbian theory).

The correlative Hebbian synaptic plasticity theory is one of the most influential ideas about the changes that may occur in the brain as it takes in new information. If cell A is frequently taking part in firing cell B, then the strength of their connection should increase. The increase in strength is based on causality and repetition between individual neurons within a neuronal population. The underlying factor is that the synapse is responsible for correct responses.

Plastic change often results from the alteration of the number of neurotransmitter receptors located on a synapse. There are several underlying mechanisms that cooperate to achieve synaptic plasticity, including changes in the quantity of neurotransmitters released into a synapse and changes in how effectively cells respond to those neurotransmitters. Synaptic plasticity in both excitatory and inhibitory synapses has been found to be dependent upon postsynaptic calcium release.

== Historical discoveries ==
In 1973, Terje Lømo and Tim Bliss first described the now widely studied phenomenon of long-term potentiation (LTP) in a publication in the Journal of Physiology. The experiment described was conducted on the synapse between the perforant path and dentate gyrus in the hippocampi of anaesthetised rabbits. They were able to show that a burst of tetanic (100 Hz) stimulus on perforant path fibres led to a dramatic and long-lasting augmentation in the post-synaptic response of cells onto which these fibres synapse in the dentate gyrus. In the same year, the pair published very similar data recorded from awake rabbits. This discovery was of particular interest due to the proposed role of the hippocampus in certain forms of memory.

== Biochemical mechanisms ==
Two molecular mechanisms for synaptic plasticity involve the NMDA and AMPA glutamate receptors. Opening of NMDA channels (which relates to the level of cellular depolarization) leads to a rise in post-synaptic Ca^{2+} concentration and this has been linked to long-term potentiation, LTP (as well as to protein kinase activation); strong depolarization of the post-synaptic cell completely displaces the magnesium ions that block NMDA ion channels and allows calcium ions to enter a cell – probably causing LTP, while weaker depolarization only partially displaces the Mg^{2+} ions, resulting in less Ca^{2+} entering the post-synaptic neuron and lower intracellular Ca^{2+} concentrations (which activate protein phosphatases and induce long-term depression, LTD).

These activated protein kinases serve to phosphorylate post-synaptic excitatory receptors (e.g. AMPA receptors), improving cation conduction, and thereby potentiating the synapse. Also, these signals recruit additional receptors into the post-synaptic membrane, stimulating the production of a modified receptor type, thereby facilitating an influx of calcium. This in turn increases post-synaptic excitation by a given pre-synaptic stimulus. This process can be reversed via the activity of protein phosphatases, which act to dephosphorylate these cation channels.

The second mechanism depends on a second messenger cascade regulating gene transcription and changes in the levels of key proteins such as CaMKII and PKAII. Activation of the second messenger pathway leads to increased levels of CaMKII and PKAII within the dendritic spine. These protein kinases have been linked to growth in dendritic spine volume and LTP processes such as the addition of AMPA receptors to the plasma membrane and phosphorylation of ion channels for enhanced permeability. Localization or compartmentalization of activated proteins occurs in the presence of their given stimulus which creates local effects in the dendritic spine. Calcium influx from NMDA receptors is necessary for the activation of CaMKII. This activation is localized to spines with focal stimulation and is inactivated before spreading to adjacent spines or the shaft, indicating an important mechanism of LTP in that particular changes in protein activation can be localized or compartmentalized to enhance the responsivity of single dendritic spines. Individual dendritic spines are capable of forming unique responses to presynaptic cells. This second mechanism can be triggered by protein phosphorylation but takes longer and lasts longer, providing the mechanism for long-lasting memory storage. The duration of the LTP can be regulated by breakdown of these second messengers. Phosphodiesterase, for example, breaks down the secondary messenger cAMP, which has been implicated in increased AMPA receptor synthesis in the post-synaptic neuron.

Long-lasting changes in the efficacy of synaptic connections (long-term potentiation, or LTP) between two neurons can involve the making and breaking of synaptic contacts. Genes such as activin ß-A, which encodes a subunit of activin A, are up-regulated during early stage LTP. The activin molecule modulates the actin dynamics in dendritic spines through the MAP-kinase pathway. By changing the F-actin cytoskeletal structure of dendritic spines, spine necks are lengthened producing increased electrical isolation. The end result is long-term maintenance of LTP.

The number of ion channels on the post-synaptic membrane affects the strength of the synapse. Research suggests that the density of receptors on post-synaptic membranes changes, affecting the neuron's excitability in response to stimuli. In a dynamic process that is maintained in equilibrium, N-methyl D-aspartate receptor (NMDA receptor) and AMPA receptors are added to the membrane by exocytosis and removed by endocytosis. These processes, and by extension the number of receptors on the membrane, can be altered by synaptic activity. Experiments have shown that AMPA receptors are delivered to the synapse through vesicular membrane fusion with the postsynaptic membrane via the protein kinase CaMKII, which is activated by the influx of calcium through NMDA receptors. CaMKII also improves AMPA ionic conductance through phosphorylation. When there is high-frequency NMDA receptor activation, there is an increase in the expression of a protein PSD-95 that increases synaptic capacity for AMPA receptors. This is what leads to a long-term increase in AMPA receptors and thus synaptic strength and plasticity.

If the strength of a synapse is only reinforced by stimulation or weakened by its lack, a positive feedback loop will develop, causing some cells never to fire and some to fire too much. But two regulatory forms of plasticity, called scaling and metaplasticity, also exist to provide negative feedback. Synaptic scaling is a primary mechanism by which a neuron is able to stabilize firing rates up or down.

Synaptic scaling is a type of homeostatic plasticity that was first described around 20 years ago. It is a negative feedback response mechanism to chronic changes in the level of network activity, in which the synaptic strengths of a neuron are modified by regulating synaptic receptors following a universal multiplicative scaling factor This effect occurs gradually over hours or days, by changing the numbers of NMDA receptors at the synapse (Pérez-Otaño and Ehlers, 2005). With Synaptic scaling correlating to homeostatic plasticity, there has been research proving the influence the pathophysiology of several neuropsychiatric and neurological disorders, such as schizophrenia and Alzheimer's disease Metaplasticity varies the threshold level at which plasticity occurs, allowing integrated responses to synaptic activity spaced over time and preventing saturated states of LTP and LTD. Since LTP and LTD (long-term depression) rely on the influx of Ca^{2+} through NMDA channels, metaplasticity may be due to changes in NMDA receptors, altered calcium buffering, altered states of kinases or phosphatases and a priming of protein synthesis machinery. Synaptic scaling is a homeostatic mechanism that helps neurons stabilize their activity by adjusting the strength of all their synapses up or down in response to prolonged changes in input. The neuronal circuitry affected by LTP/LTD and modified by scaling and metaplasticity leads to reverberatory neural circuit development and regulation in a Hebbian manner which is manifested as memory, whereas the changes in neural circuitry, which begin at the level of the synapse, are an integral part in the ability of an organism to learn.

There is also a specificity element of biochemical interactions to create synaptic plasticity, namely the importance of location. Processes occur at microdomains – such as exocytosis of AMPA receptors is spatially regulated by the t-SNARE STX4. Specificity is also an important aspect of CAMKII signaling involving nanodomain calcium. The spatial gradient of PKA between dendritic spines and shafts is also important for the strength and regulation of synaptic plasticity. It is important to remember that the biochemical mechanisms altering synaptic plasticity occur at the level of individual synapses of a neuron. Since the biochemical mechanisms are confined to these "microdomains," the resulting synaptic plasticity affects only the specific synapse at which it took place.

Aside from this, recent research has demonstrated that synaptic plasticity has inspired models in artificial neural networks and have been applied in computational neuroscience and artificial neural networks to model how systems learn and adapt to changing inputs. Synaptic scaling is not just biological but has also been introduced to ANNs. Synaptic scaling helps networks learn more effectively Studies have shown that synaptic scaling-based approaches can further improve performance across a range of network architectures, including feedforward and recurrent neural networks.

== Theoretical mechanisms ==
A bidirectional model, describing both LTP and LTD, of synaptic plasticity has proved necessary for a number of different learning mechanisms in computational neuroscience, neural networks, and biophysics. Three major hypotheses for the molecular nature of this plasticity have been well-studied, and none are required to be the exclusive mechanism:

1. Change in the probability of glutamate release.
2. Insertion or removal of post-synaptic AMPA receptors.
3. Phosphorylation and de-phosphorylation inducing a change in AMPA receptor conductance.

Of these, the latter two hypotheses have been recently mathematically examined to have identical calcium-dependent dynamics which provides strong theoretical evidence for a calcium-based model of plasticity, which in a linear model where the total number of receptors are conserved looks like

$$\frac{d W_i(t)}{d t}=\frac{1}{\tau([Ca^{2+}]_i)}\left(\Omega([Ca^{2+}]_i)-W_i\right),$$

where

- $W_i$ is the synaptic weight of the $i$th input axon,
- $[Ca^{2+}]$ is the concentration of calcium,
- $\tau$ is a time constant dependent on the insertion and removal rates of neurotransmitter receptors, which is dependent on $[Ca^{2+}]$, and
- $\Omega=\beta A_m^{\rm fp}$ is also a function of the concentration of calcium that depends linearly on the number of receptors on the membrane of the neuron at some fixed point.

Both $\Omega$ and $\tau$ are found experimentally and agree on results from both hypotheses. The model makes important simplifications that make it unsuited for actual experimental predictions but provides a significant basis for the hypothesis of a calcium-based synaptic plasticity dependence.

== Short-term plasticity ==
Short-term synaptic plasticity acts on a timescale of tens of milliseconds to a few minutes, unlike long-term plasticity, which lasts from minutes to hours. Short-term plasticity can either strengthen or weaken a synapse.

=== Synaptic enhancement ===
Short-term synaptic enhancement results from an increased probability of synaptic terminals releasing transmitters in response to pre-synaptic action potentials. Synapses will strengthen for a short time because of an increase in the amount of packaged transmitter released in response to each action potential. Depending on the time scales over which it acts synaptic enhancement is classified as neural facilitation, synaptic augmentation or post-tetanic potentiation.

=== Synaptic depression ===
Synaptic fatigue or depression is usually attributed to the depletion of the readily releasable vesicles. Depression can also arise from post-synaptic processes and from feedback activation of presynaptic receptors. heterosynaptic depression is thought to be linked to the release of adenosine triphosphate (ATP) from astrocytes.

Many different signaling pathways are involved in synaptic plasticity. These pathways take part in the creation of new proteins, moving proteins around, and changing gene transcription. The best-known pathways are those involved in LTP in the hippocampus. The later stages of LTP require new proteins, and changes in gene transcription. Several of these pathways include CaMK, nNOS, ERK, and Akt. G-protein coupled receptors also play a role in synaptic plasticity. In depression, changes to these pathways may affect both neurons and glia. A decrease in glial and neuronal size may influence the loss of gray-matter seen in several brain regions in people with depression.

== Long-term plasticity ==
Long-term depression (LTD) and long-term potentiation (LTP) are two forms of long-term plasticity, lasting minutes or more, that occur at excitatory synapses. NMDA-dependent LTD and LTP have been extensively researched, and are found to require the binding of glutamate, and glycine or D-serine for activation of NMDA receptors. The turning point for the synaptic modification of a synapse has been found to be modifiable itself, depending on the history of the synapse. Recently, a number of attempts have been made to offer a comprehensive model that could account for most forms of synaptic plasticity.

=== D-Serine ===
Astrocytes in the hippocampus show that they can influence synaptic plasticity by modulating the presence of D-serine at the synapse. Astrocytes have vesicles in which they store D-serine and release it when they become stimulated by glutamate and also by D-serine as co-activators of the NMDA receptors that were already discussed. In effect, this means that an important thing that determines how robustly and consistently each synapse will be involved in the signaling associated with plasticity is the amount of D-serine present at that synapse.

Astrocytes also demonstrate that glial cells are not simply supportive structural cells, but important modulatory components of neuronal communication that ensure NMDA receptor-dependent processes such as long-term potentiation occur effectively.

Disruption to astrocytic release of D-serine reduces the ability of synapses to strengthen, thereby demonstrating the close relationship between cognitive function and glial regulation. Glial cells control the availability of NMDA receptor co-agonist D-serine, which further demonstrates the level of coordination between glial cells and neurons regarding when learning and memory occur. Ultimately, this highlights the important modulating role of astrocytes on the synaptic microenvironment required to support synaptic adaptations and retention of information.

=== Long-term depression ===
Brief activation of an excitatory pathway can produce what is known as long-term depression (LTD) of synaptic transmission in many areas of the brain. LTD is induced by a minimum level of postsynaptic depolarization and simultaneous increase in the intracellular calcium concentration at the postsynaptic neuron. LTD can be initiated at inactive synapses if the calcium concentration is raised to the minimum required level by heterosynaptic activation, or if the extracellular concentration is raised. These alternative conditions capable of causing LTD differ from the Hebb rule, and instead depend on synaptic activity modifications. D-serine release by astrocytes has been found to lead to a significant reduction of LTD in the hippocampus. Activity-dependent LTD was investigated in 2011 for the electrical synapses (modification of Gap Junctions efficacy through their activity). In the brain, cerebellum is one of the structures where LTD is a form of neuroplasticity.

Long-term depression (LTD) is commonly induced through low-frequency stimulation and the NMDA receptor's role in mediating calcium signaling, resulting in the internalization/deactivation of AMPA receptors. The primary function of LTD is to provide balance against Long-term potentiation (LTP) and help avoid excessive strengthening of synapses, allowing for the brain to "update," 'modify' or "erase" previously-obsolete information. Lastly, LTD is modulated by several factors, including neurotrophic factors, stress, development, etc., and there are still gaps in our understanding of how these variances affect LTD.

=== Long-term potentiation ===
Long-term potentiation, commonly referred to as LTP, is an increase in synaptic response following potentiating pulses of electrical stimuli that sustains at a level above the baseline response for hours or longer. LTP involves interactions between postsynaptic neurons and the specific presynaptic inputs that form a synaptic association, and is specific to the stimulated pathway of synaptic transmission. The long-term stabilization of synaptic changes is determined by a parallel increase of pre- and postsynaptic structures such as axonal bouton, dendritic spine and postsynaptic density. On the molecular level, an increase of the postsynaptic scaffolding proteins PSD-95 and Homer1c has been shown to correlate with the stabilization of synaptic enlargement.

Modification of astrocyte coverage at the synapses in the hippocampus has been found to result from the induction of LTP, which has been found to be linked to the release of D-serine, nitric oxide, and the chemokine, s100B by astrocytes. LTP is also a model for studying the synaptic basis of Hebbian plasticity. Induction conditions resemble those described for the initiation of long-term depression (LTD), but a stronger depolarization and a greater increase of calcium are necessary to achieve LTP. Experiments performed by stimulating an array of individual dendritic spines, have shown that synaptic cooperativity by as few as two adjacent dendritic spines prevents LTD, allowing only LTP.

== Spike-timing-dependent plasticity (STDP) ==
Spike-timing-dependent plasticity (STDP) is a major and widely studied form of synaptic plasticity. It is when the precise timing of spikes in the presynaptic and postsynaptic neurons determines whether a synapse is strengthened or weakened. Generally, if a presynaptic neuron fires right before a postsynaptic neuron, the synapse is intensified. In contrast, if the presynaptic neuron fires after the postsynaptic neuron, the synapse is weakened. STDP provides a precise timing-based form of Hebbian learning that helps the brain form memories and coordinate neural activity. Additionally, STDP can occur at inhibitory synapses and is influenced by neuromodulators such as dopamine and acetylcholine.

== Homeostatic plasticity ==
Homeostatic plasticity is a form of synaptic plasticity that stabilizes neural activity by modifying synaptic strength and neuronal excitability. This homeostatic mechanism is able to maintain network stability over time, unlike Hebbian plasticity which strengthens or weakens synapses based on activity patterns. Since this mechanism works to tune the ratio between excitatory and inhibitory synaptic inputs, it is especially important over developmental periods when circuits are maturing. Disruptions in homeostatic plasticity have been linked to neurological disorders.

== Synaptic strength ==
The modification of synaptic strength is referred to as functional plasticity. Changes in synaptic strength involve distinct mechanisms of particular types of glial cells, the most researched type being astrocytes.

Synapses are highly specialized structures that mediate communication between neurons. The establishment of changes in synaptic strength involves both the pre and post synaptic mechanisms. It also depends upon the movement and synthesis of receptors and other synaptic proteins.

== Computational use of plasticity ==
Every kind of synaptic plasticity has different computational uses. Short-term facilitation has been demonstrated to serve as both working memory and mapping input for readout, and short-term depression for removing auto-correlation. Long-term potentiation is used for spatial memory storage, while long-term depression is used for both encoding space features, selective weakening of synapses and clearing old memory traces respectively. Forward spike-timing-dependent plasticity is used for long range temporal correlation, and temporal and spatiotemporal coding. The reversed spike-timing-dependent plasticity acts as sensory filtering.

== Synaptic plasticity in disease ==
Synaptic plasticity has been known to be directly implicated in neurological disorders such as Alzheimer's, a neurodegenerative disease that causes problems in memory and learning. Recent research has begun to shift their focus to identify biomarkers in the brain as a way to slow the progression of the disease. Synaptic biomarkers, or proteins found in cerebral spinal fluid, have been found to be linked to early indicators of Alzheimer's disease progression in a study that observed over 700 people:

Biomarkers linked to excitatory neuron communication, specifically Neuronal Pentraxin (NPTX2), were observed at low levels to determine correlation. Individuals with low levels of NPTX2 were found to have amyloid buildup but no tau, indicating issues with memory-related circuits. Furthermore, these findings suggest early synaptic failure before the disease fully developed, as the reduction of NPTX2 matched memory problems as well as shrinkage to the medial temporal lobe.

Conversely, abnormally high levels of 14-3-3 proteins, regulators of synaptic plasticity and cell signaling, have been found to be indicators of neuronal stress. Individuals with high levels of these proteins exhibited both amyloid and tau buildup, which were linked to stress and abnormal plasticity. Higher levels of these proteins also predicted greater memory decline that corresponds to hippocampal atrophy, the shrinking of the hippocampus.

While LTP has been linked to memory the connection between theta rhythm and memory is still unclear. In a recent study researchers suggest that theta rhythm fosters good conditions for memory encoding which further link to disorders like Alzheimer's and epilepsy. The study showed that under physiological conditions, theta-phase dependent LTP occurred while place cells showed membrane potential oscillations, which are ideal LTP candidates. This suggests that the theta-phase dependent LTP supports memory encoding and when disrupting this or the theta oscillations it can further affect memory in disorders such as Alzheimer's.

== Synaptic plasticity and aging ==
As the brain ages, many individuals experience a decline in memory and learning, which has been known to be linked to changes in synaptic plasticity. The hippocampus, the brain's main function for creating new memories, becomes implicated with age. Although this concept of neuronal communication weakening with age has been understood as the primary source for deficits in memory, researchers have recently been aiming to address what specific biological changes are responsible. One possible contributor to this is the regulation of the lGF-2 gene, which produces the protein lFG-2, a protein known to support memory and synaptic function.

The gene lGF-2 aids in synaptic plasticity in the hippocampus. In a study involving rats, researchers found a decrease in this gene due to methylation, a chemical tag that reduces gene activity. This decrease of lFG-2 was linked to poorer memory and weak long-term potentiation, a system involved in strengthening synapses. The researchers then tested whether restoring the gene through a CRISPR-based method would increase the lFG-2 promoter by activating the DNA marks. In older rats, the treatment successfully improved both memory and synaptic function, suggesting that reversing these age-related changes could help restore synaptic activity in aging brains.

Hesperetin, a flavonoid, aids in treating emotional memory deficit in aging. Researchers conducted a study involving aged rats that exhibited impaired emotional memory and LTP. Researchers found that when the Hesperetin was orally distributed not only did their impaired emotional memory improve but so did their impaired LTP by balancing oxidant-antioxidant the AMPAR trafficking. This suggests Hesperetin has a crucial role in synaptic plasticity and could treat emotional memory deficit in aging.

== See also ==
- Brain-derived neurotrophic factor
- Homosynaptic plasticity
- Homeostatic plasticity
- Inhibitory postsynaptic potential
- Activity-dependent plasticity
- Neural backpropagation
- Neuroplasticity
- Postsynaptic potential
- Psychoplastogen
- Non-synaptic plasticity
