= Post-tetanic potentiation =

Post-tetanic potentiation (PTP) is the transient increase in neurotransmitter release that follows a brief, high-frequency train of action potentials that can occur within central synapses and Neuromuscular junctions (NMJ). This form of short-term synaptic plasticity increases neurotransmitter release, resulting in a significant increase in evoked postsynaptic response.The resulting increase in synaptic output may last for tens of seconds to several minutes.Research suggests that PTP results from residual Ca^{2+} accumulation in the presynaptic terminal, which increases quantal release probability and enhances the readily releasable pool of synaptic vesicles. In neuron-neuron synapses the effects of PTP manifest as larger excitatory post-synaptic potentials (EPSPs) and increase likelihood of action potentials. At the NMJ the PTP results in larger End-plate potentials (EPP) that increase the likelihood of muscle contraction. A synapse's capacity for PTP varies depending on the identities of the presynaptic and postsynaptic cell.

== Mechanisms ==
The mechanism(s) that underlie PTP can vary across synapses. While PTP is triggered by an increase in presynaptic Ca^{2+} concentration, specific regulatory pathways vary. A major contributor to PTP in many synapses is Protein Kinase C (PKC)-dependent signaling.

PKC has been implicated in mediating PTP at CA3-CA1 synapses in the rat hippocampus. PKC inhibitors blocked the potentiation induced by a tetanic stimulus train, suggesting an important role in the presynaptic mechanism of PTP.

Experiments on large-caliber synapses of the calyx of Held suggest that PTP results from increases in both quantal size and quantal content, each regulated by distinct mechanisms. Inhibition of PKC appeared to block the increase in quantal content but displayed no effect on quantal size. PKC is believed to increase the probability of vesicle release, resulting in larger EPSCs. The PKC-independent increase in quantal size is proposed to be mediated by synaptic vesicle fusion, although the upstream regulation is unknown. The fusion of synaptic vesicles results in a stronger postsynaptic response due to the greater amount of neurotransmitters per quantum.

== Molecular regulation ==
=== RIM1α ===
RIM1α is a protein present in the presynaptic neuron believed to be an effector of the protein Rab3A. At the active zone, RIM1α interacts with several other molecules to form a protein scaffold at the presynaptic nerve terminal. Research suggests that RIM1α is implicated in restricting the duration of post-tetanic potentiation in excitatory synapses. A study of mice found that PTP was strongly enhanced in RIM1α-knockout mice.

=== Synapsin ===
Synapsin II is an abundant phosphoprotein known for its involvement in vesicle release. Synapsin II, along with synapsins I and III, anchors synaptic vesicles to the actin cytoskeleton to form the reserve pool. Upon its phosphorylation, it dissociates from the vesicles, allowing them to travel to the active zone. Studies have found that synapsin II knockout mice show a decrease in post-tetanic potentiation. This same effect is seen in synapsin I/II double knockout mice.

== Observations ==
Post-tetanic potentiation usually lasts in the range of several minutes (shorter potentiations are usually referred to as 'augmentations'). PTPs are observed when synapses are stimulated with repetitive (tetanic) pulses, by means of prolonged trains of stimuli applied at high frequencies (10 Hz to 200 Hz stimuli applied for .2 seconds to 5 seconds).

PTPs are thought to result primarily from the buildup of calcium concentration in the axon terminal of the presynaptic neuron during the stimulus train. However, this is a topic under debate as changes that last this long outlive the rate at which calcium is transported out of the presynaptic neuron.

In some cases, depression can be observed instead of potentiation following the tetanic stimulus.

== See also ==
- Long-term potentiation
