= Short-term synaptic depression =

Form of neural negative feedback

This is a diagram of a typical central nervous system synapse. The presynaptic and postsynaptic neuron are on top and bottom, respectively. Synaptic vesicles are represented as tan spheres and postsynaptic receptors are dark green. If the presynaptic vesicles are released at a faster rate into the synaptic cleft than re-uptake can recycle them, synaptic fatigue begins to occur.

Short-term synaptic depression, or synaptic fatigue, is an activity-dependent form of short term synaptic plasticity that results in the temporary inability of neurons to fire and therefore transmit an input signal. It is thought to be a form of negative feedback in order to physiologically control particular forms of nervous system activity.

Short-term depression is caused by a temporary depletion of synaptic vesicles that house neurotransmitters in the synapse, generally produced by persistent high frequency neuronal stimulation. The neurotransmitters are released by the synapse to propagate the signal to the postsynaptic cell. This stored pool of quickly releasable synaptic vesicles influences information processing in the central nervous system. It has also been hypothesized that short-term synaptic depression could be a result of postsynaptic receptor desensitization or changes in postsynaptic passive conductance, but recent evidence has suggested that it is primarily a presynaptic phenomenon.

== Background ==
Chemical synapses allow for signal transmission when a presynaptic cell releases neurotransmitters into the synapse to bind to receptors on a postsynaptic cell. These neurotransmitters are synthesized in the presynaptic cell and housed in vesicles until released. Once neurotransmitters are released into the synaptic cleft and a signal is relayed, re-uptake begins, which is the process of recycling neurotransmitters from the cleft using transport proteins. Re-uptake allows for a new signal to be propagated quickly without synthesizing all new neurotransmitters. After being released, there is a time delay for the synaptic vesicle to be replaced, which can lead to depletion of releasable vesicles. If stimulation occurs at a high enough frequency and with enough strength, neurotransmitters will be released at a faster rate than re-uptake can recycle them. This ultimately depletes the neurotransmitters as well as the readily releasable vesicles, so a signal can no longer be transmitted. Subsequent action potentials may not be able to elicit a response in the postsynaptic neuron, which is a form of short-term synaptic depression.

== Functional significance ==
It has previously been shown that repeated short trains of action potentials causes an exponential decay of the synaptic response amplitudes in the neurons of many neural networks, specifically the caudal pontine reticular nucleus (PnC). Depression is specifically induced by these short trains of action potentials from the presynaptic neuron, as opposed to single pulses or postsynaptic receptor fatigue. Recent research has suggested that only repeated burst stimulation, as opposed to single or paired pulse stimulation, at a very high frequency can result in short-term synaptic depression. Some cells, like aortic baroreceptor neurons, could lose the ability to regulate aortic blood pressure if the onset of short-term synaptic depression were to affect them. Metabotropic glutamate autoreceptor activation in these neurons may inhibit synaptic transmission by inhibiting calcium influx, decreasing synaptic vesicle exocytosis and modulating the mechanisms governing synaptic vesicle recovery and endocytosis.

== Synaptic recovery ==
Synaptic vesicles release neurotransmitters into the synapse to pass on a signal, then neurotransmitter re-uptake must occur to be recycled and released again. Neurotransmitter vesicles are recycled through the process of endocytosis. Because each presynaptic cell can link up to thousands of connections with other neurons, short-term synaptic depression and its recovery can cause interactions with other neuronal circuits and affect their kinetics. There is evidence that synaptic depression can lead to enhancement of post synaptic signaling given that the synchronous release of synaptic vesicles recovers more quickly than asynchronous release. In many synapses however, enhancement, such as augmentation and facilitation, is dominated by synaptic depression due to depletion of vesicle pools.

=== Timing ===
Maintaining a readily releasable vesicle pool is important in allowing for the constant ability to pass physiological signals between neurons. The timing it takes for neurotransmitters to be released into the synaptic cleft and then recycled back to the presynaptic cell for reuse is not currently well understood. There are two models currently proposed to attempt to understand this process. One model predicts that during neurotransmitter release, the vesicle undergoes complete fusion with the presynaptic cellular membrane once emptied. This is called "full-collapse fusion". Then, endocytosis, or the internalization of vesicular membrane from the plasma membrane in a clathrin-dependent mode must occur, which could take up to tens of seconds. The second model tries to explain this phenomenon by assuming the vesicles immediately begin to recycle neurotransmitters after release, which takes less than a second to complete endocytosis. Called "kiss-and-run" exocytosis, a transient pore is formed between the synaptic vesicle and the plasma membrane, allowing part of the contents to be released into the synaptic cleft. This model of vesicle fusion allows for quick vesicle endocytosis and reuse. One study showed varying times of complete endocytosis ranging from 5.5-38.9 seconds. It also indicated that these times were completely independent of long term or chronic activity.

== Affected cells ==
Short-term synaptic depression can affect many synapses of many different types of neurons. The existence and observations of short-term synaptic depression are accepted universally, although the exact mechanisms underlying the phenomenon are not completely understood. It is generally seen in mature cells at high frequencies of stimuli (>1 Hz). One specific example is that the gill withdrawal reflex of the Aplysia is caused by homosynaptic depression. Although homosynaptic and heterosynaptic depression can lead to long-term depression and/or potentiation, this particular case is a short-term example of how homosynaptic depression causes short-term synaptic depression. Perforant path–granule cells (PP-GC) in the dentate gyrus of the hippocampus in adult rats have been shown to display short-term synaptic depression at lower frequencies (0.05-0.2 Hz). In the developing rat PP-GCs, two types of synaptic plasticity were shown to lead to short-term synaptic depression, first being a low frequency reversible depression of presynaptic vesicle release, and secondly a form of nonreversible depression caused by AMPA silencing. The second form of plasticity disappears with maturation of PP-GCs, although the reversible low frequency depression remains unchanged.

== Role in neural plasticity ==
Synaptic vesicles are thought to be part of three distinct pools: the readily releasable pool (comprises approximately 5% of total vesicles), the recycling pool (about 15%), and the reserve pool (the remaining 80%). The reserve pool seems to only begin to release vesicles in response to intense stimulation. There have been several studies that suggest the reserve vesicles are seldom ever released in response to physiological stimuli which raises questions about their importance. This release in vesicles, regardless of which pool they are released from, is considered a form of short-term synaptic plasticity because it is changing the functional characteristics of the presynaptic cell, temporarily altering its firing properties. The difference between this and long-term potentiation is that short-term plasticity only occurs for the duration of time it takes to recycle and reuse neurotransmitters, as opposed to occurring consistently over a period of time. Short-term synaptic depression is on the millisecond time scale, compared to hours or days for long-term potentiation. The time it takes for synaptic vesicles to be recycled affects a presynaptic neuron's firing rate and ability to release neurotransmitters. The reserve pool of the presynaptic neuron is however important for replenishing vesicles of the readily releasable pool. Along with the calcium dynamics, myosin plays a crucial role in the plasticity of the presynaptic neuron. Once the reserve pool of synaptic vesicles have been trafficked to the readily releasable pool, Myosin II, V, and VI play essential roles in preparing these vesicles for release through mechanisms of localization. Localization allows for synaptic vesicles to become releasable within the active zone, and this replenishment occurs within the millisecond time scale.

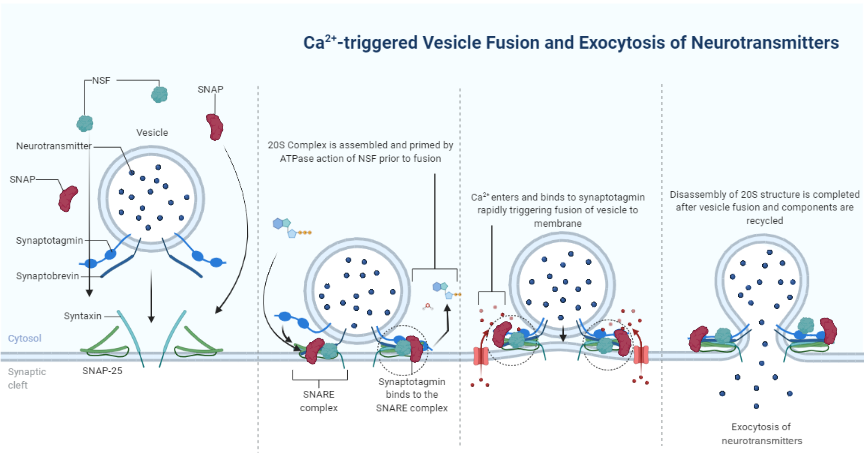
Calcium dependent release of neurotransmitters. Vesicle fuses with presynaptic membrane at synaptic terminal using SNARE proteins. Neurotransmitters are then released into the synaptic cleft.

=== Calcium Dynamics ===
Synaptic plasticity can occur due to Ca^{2+} mechanisms in the presynaptic neuron. In the case of short-term synaptic depression, rapid action potentials will present a decrease in post-synaptic potential due to the lack of neurotransmitter release. This is due in part to the lack of synaptic vesicles for release, which can be caused by a decreased availability of release-ready vesicles bound near a calcium channel after the first action potential. The replenishment of release-ready synaptic vesicles is also directly impacted and facilitated by the presynaptic influx of Ca^{2+}, allowing for the recruitment of synaptic vesicles from the reserve pool through several different protein signaling cascades involving motor proteins and an active zone protein complex.

== Role in CNS pathologies ==
Short-term synaptic depression has not been shown to directly cause or result in a central nervous system pathology, although the degrees at which it is activated in cells has been studied as a result of particular pathologies and diseases. Long-term changes in a neuron or synapse, resulting in a permanent change in a neuron's excitatory properties, can cause short-term synaptic depression to occur from much more or less activation, which could potentially lead to some sort of physiological abnormality. Synaptopathies are relatively newly studied diseases rising from dysfunctional synapses, including faulty ion channels, receptors, or neurotransmitter release proteins. More research must be conducted to determine causes and correlation between short-term depression and pathologies.

=== Alzheimer's disease ===
Hallmarks of Alzheimer's disease (AD) are impairment of cognition, aggregation of β-amyloid peptide (Aβ), neurofibrillary degeneration, loss of neurons with accelerated atrophy of specific brain areas, and decrease of synapse number in surviving neurons. Research indicates both pre- and postsynaptic mechanisms resulting in AD. One specific abnormality includes an increased amount of presynaptic protein APP, which is a precursor molecule for β-amyloid peptide (Aβ). A study was conducted where short-term synaptic depression was compared between transgenic mice over-expressing APP/PS1 with their littermates who did not over-express the protein. The results showed that depression was more significantly pronounced in the APP/PS1 mice, which indicates a decrease in the amount of readily releasable pools of vesicles in the presynaptic neuron. The mechanism of APP-induced depression is still not fully understood, however, it has been found that production of Aβ leads to a reduction in excitatory synaptic transmission by reducing presynaptic vesicle recycling. Conclusions from this study include short-term synaptic depression being primarily a presynaptic phenomenon and not being affected by postsynaptic receptor desensitization. Also, that short-term synaptic depression is not a result of Ca^{2+} ions building up in the terminal, but most importantly that short-term synaptic depression is an important player and can be studied when researching the causes and effects of some neurodegenerative diseases.

=== Depression ===
Antidepressants have short-term and long-term effects in depressed patients. The short-term effects are explained by a hypothesis that states that depression is acutely brought on by an immediate decrease in catecholamines in the brain. Antidepressants act immediately to inhibit this decrease and restore normal levels of these neurotransmitters in the brain. Under stressed conditions, vesicle exocytosis is potentiated and a release of catecholamines causes depression of presynaptic cells because of depleted neurotransmitters. Therapeutic doses of fluoxetine have been shown to decrease these neuronal fatigue states by inhibiting vesicle release and thereby preventing short-term synaptic depression in hippocampal neurons. Also, administration of therapeutic levels of fluoxetine increases the expression of synaptic proteins that are involved in both exo- and endocytosis. This medication allows the neurons to dynamically respond to variations in synaptic stimulations and maintain the appropriate levels of neurotransmitters to combat the symptoms of depression. These findings show that fluoxetine as well as other antidepressants that act through the same mechanisms enhance neurorecovery and neurotransmission to reduce the risk of depression.

== Unanswered questions ==
- Although now short-term synaptic depression is thought to primarily be a presynaptic phenomenon, could postsynaptic processes account for a larger portion of the causes that are currently understood for short-term synaptic depression?
- Recycling of synaptic-vesicle membrane proteins is rapid, as indicated by the ability of many neurons to fire fifty times a second, and quite specific, in that several membrane proteins unique to the synaptic vesicles are specifically internalized by endocytosis. Endocytosis usually involves clathrin-coated vesicles, though non-clathrin-coated vesicles may also be used. After the endocytic vesicles lose their clathrin coat, however, they usually do not fuse with larger, low pH endosomes, as they do during endocytosis of plasma-membrane proteins in other cells. Rather, the recycled vesicles are immediately refilled with neurotransmitter.
