= Heterosynaptic plasticity =

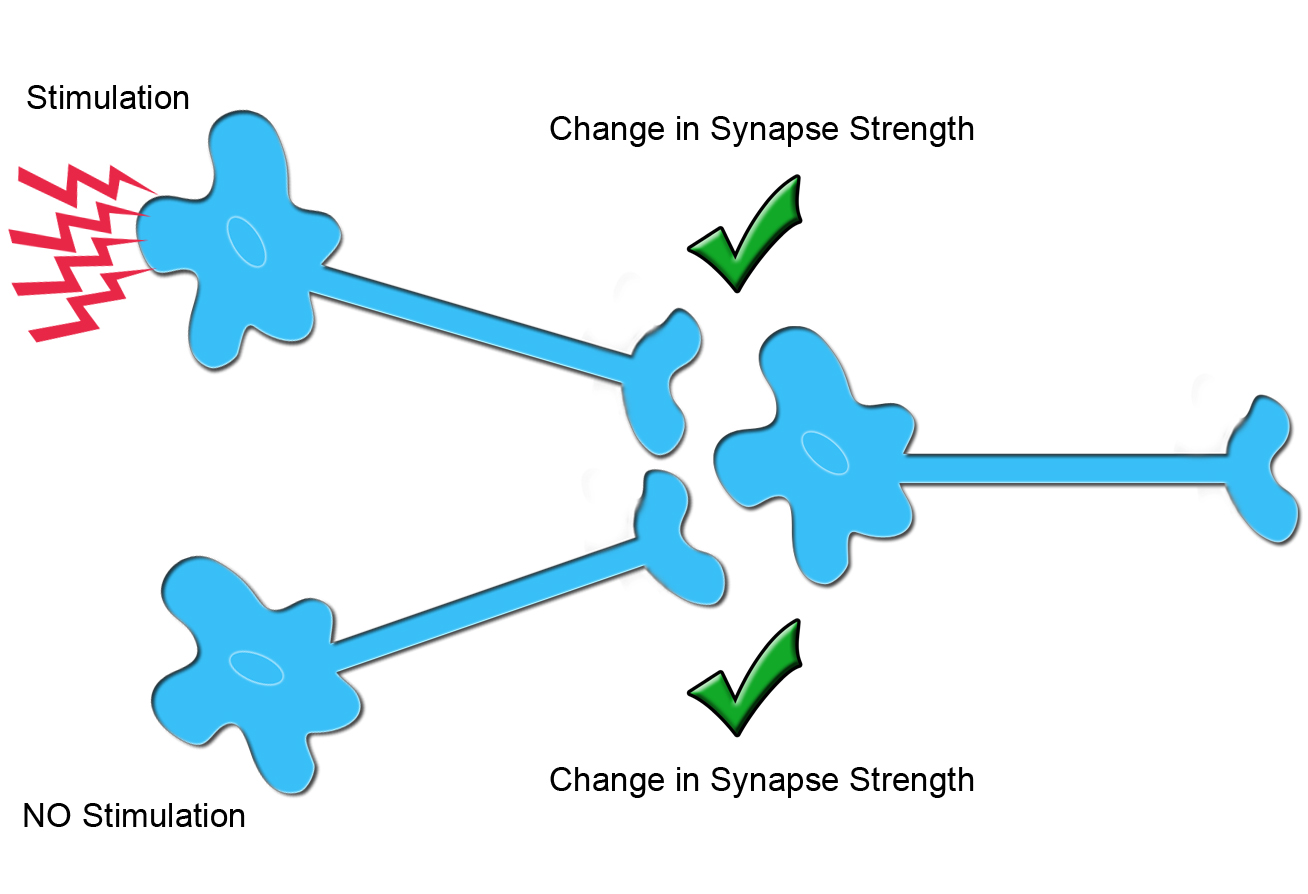
In heterosynaptic plasticity, synaptic pathways that are not specifically stimulated undergo synaptic plasticity, in addition to those who are specifically stimulated.

Heterosynaptic plasticity is a form of synaptic plasticity, in which changes in synaptic strength are induced by activity at neighboring synapses or by modulatory inputs, rather than by activity at the synapse itself. Synaptic plasticity more broadly refers to activity-dependent changes in the strength of connections between neurons and is widely associated with learning and memory. In contrast, to homosynaptic (Hebbian) plasticity, which is input-specific, heterosynaptic plasticity involves changes driven by external or modulatory signals and can result in either synaptic potentiation or depression. Heterosynaptic mechanisms have been implicated in processes such as synaptic homeostasis, neural circuit development, and associative learning. These mechanisms enable neural systems to integrate multiple sources of activity while maintaining stability and flexibility in network function.

== Modulatory input-dependent plasticity (Heterosynaptic Plasticity) Exemplified ==
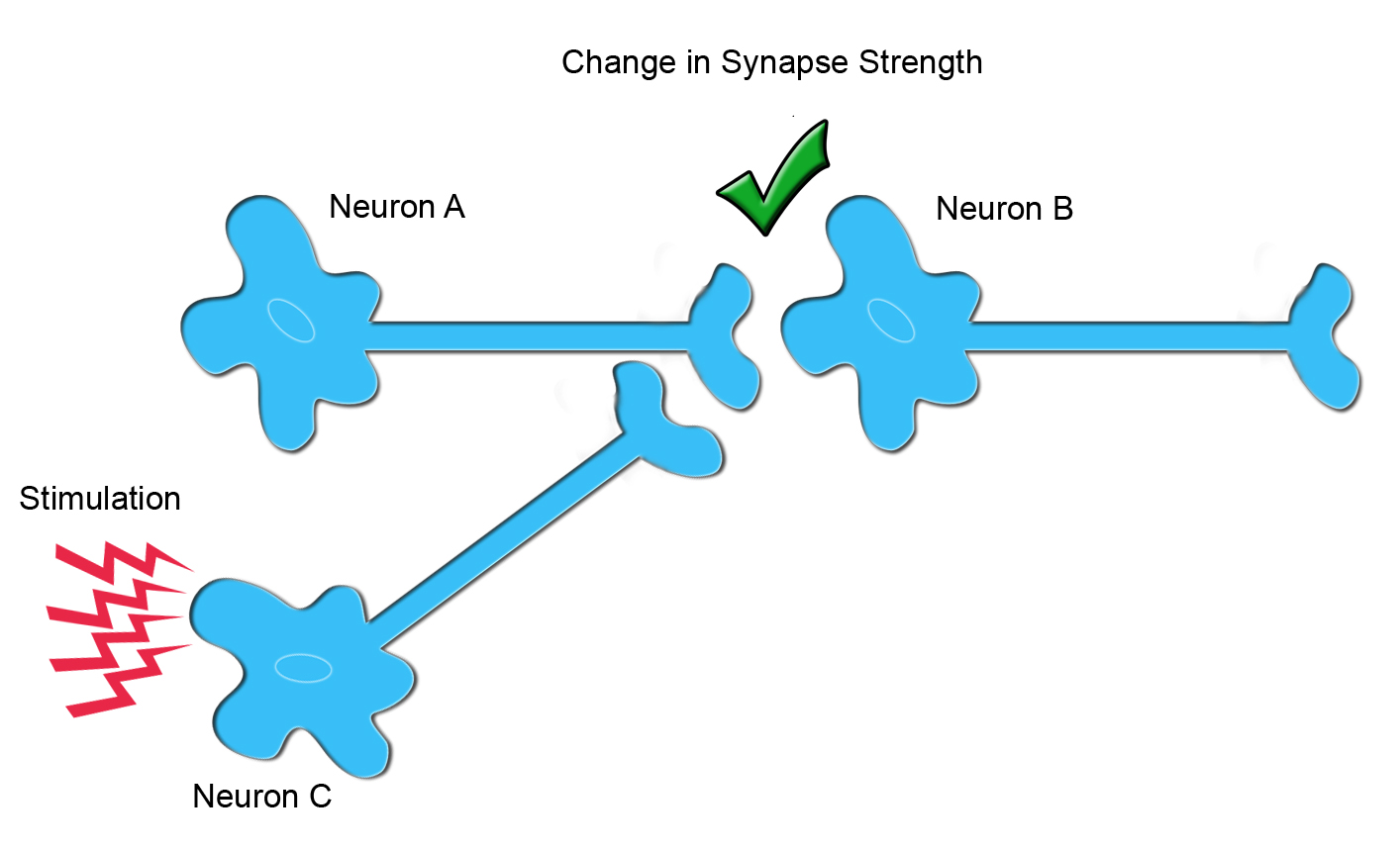
In modulatory input-dependent plasticity, Neuron C acts as an interneuron, releasing neuromodulators, which alter synaptic strength between Neuron A and Neuron B.

Modulatory input-dependent plasticty is a form of heterosynaptic plasticity mediated by neuromodulation, in which modulatory neurons release neuromodulators that alter synaptic function. Unlike classical neurotransmitters, neuromodulators typically do not directly produce fast electrical responses in target neurons. Instead, they modify the efficacy of neurotransmission at nearby synapses, often producing longer-lasting effects. These modulatory influences can result in either synaptic potentiation or depression and are often regulated by metaplasticity, in which prior synaptic activity alters the capacity for future plastic changes.

Several neurotransmitters can function as neuromodulators, particularly biogenic amines such as dopamine and serotonin. Their effects are commonly mediated through G-protein Coupled Receptors (GPCRs), although ionotropic mechanisms may also occur depending on the neuronal context. Activation of these pathways can influence synaptic transmission by altering factors such as neurotransmitter release probability or postsynaptic responsiveness.

The use of these neuromodulators is an example of heterosynaptic plasticity, as these signals originate from neurons that are not directly involved in the active synapse. Neuromodulators, often released by interneurons, can influence communication efficiency between presynaptic and postsynaptic neurons indirectly by altering neurotransmitter release probability. This process does not directly trigger postsynaptic activation but instead modifies synaptic strength through modulatory input. Examples include serotonergic modulation in Aplysia californica and dopaminergic signaling in other neural systems.

=== Aplysia californica ===
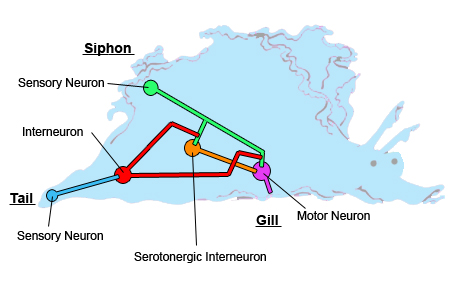
In Aplysia californica, modulatory interneurons release serotonin, triggering synaptic plasticity in motor neurons.

In Aplysia californica, modulatory interneurons release serotonin, which can induce synaptic plasticity in motor neurons. Aplysia californica is a commonly used model organism for studying synaptic plasticity and neural signaling due to its relatively simple nervous system, which allows individual neural circuits to be identified and studied. Work by Eric Kandel and colleagues, using Aplysia contributed to the understanding that learning and memory are associated with long-term synaptic strength changes in the brain.

Early studies in Aplysia demonstrated both heterosynaptic plasticity and neuromodulation through behavioral paradigms such as habituation and sensitization. Habituation, which is associated with synaptic depression, and sensitization, which is associated with synaptic facilitation, were observed by measuring the gill withdrawal reflex in response to tactile stimulation. Light touch to the siphon activates sensory neurons, while repeated stimulation leads to a reduced response over time.

Mechanical stimulation of the siphon (see figure), activates sensory neurons, producing excitatory postsynaptic potentials (EPSP) in motor neurons that drive the gill withdrawal reflex. With repeated stimulation, habituation occurs, leading to reduced synaptic efficacy at the sensory-motor neuron synapse and decreased EPSPs, resulting in a diminished behavioral response. This process involves depression at the glutamatergic sensory-motor synapse and reflects reduced synaptic transmission underlying habituation. Conversely, noxious stimulation, such as stimulation of the tail, produces sensitization of the gill contraction response. This stimulus activates modulatory interneurons that release serotonin onto siphon neurons, enhancing neurotransmitter release and increasing EPSPs in motor neurons. When noxious stimulation is paired with light touch to the siphon, the resulting facilaition can persist beyond the initial stimulus. Compared to other forms of short-term synaptic plasticity, these neuromodulatory effects can last for longer periods, and repeated pairing can lead to more persistent changes in synaptic strength. These findings provide evidence for heterosynaptic strengthening between sensory and motor neurons in Aplysia neural circuits.

=== Dopaminergic synapses ===
Heterosynaptic plasticity is not limited to serotonergic systems and can involve a range of neuromodulators, including neuropeptides, cannabinoids, and nitric oxide. Dopamine is a well-characterized neuromodulator that can influence synaptic plasticity through heterosynaptic mechanisms. Like serotonin receptors in Aplysia, dopamine receptors are primarily G-protein-coupled receptors (GPCRs) that can activate intracellular signaling pathways such as cyclic AMP (cAMP). In mammalian systems, dopamine is released from modulatory neurons and can alter synaptic efficacy at nearby synapses without directly driving postsynaptic activity. This form of signaling is consistent with heterosynaptic plasticity, as dopamine modulates communication between other neurons rather than acting at the active synapse itself. In both dopaminergic and GABAergic circuits, dopamine can influence synaptic transmission and plasticity through these indirect mechanisms. Dopamine-dependent heterosynaptic plasticity is often associated with long-term depression, (LTD), particularly through activation of D1-like receptors, which contribute to the induction and regulation of synaptic weakening. These mechanisms have been studied in brain regions such as the ventral segmental area and nucleus accumbent, where dopamine signaling plays a role in shaping synaptic responses. Overall, dopaminergic signaling provides an example of how neuromodulators can both regulate and induce changes in synaptic strength through heterosynaptic processes.

== Heterosynaptic Plasticity's Homeostatic role ==
Heterosynaptic plasticity may play an important homeostatic role in neural plasticity by normalizing or limiting the total change of synaptic input during ongoing Hebbian plasticity. Hebbian plasticity, an ubiquitous form of homosynaptic, associative plasticity, is believed to underlie learning and memory. Moreover, Hebbian plasticity is induced by and amplifies correlations in neural circuits which creates a positive feedback loop and renders neural circuits unstable. To avoid too much instability Hebbian plasticity needs to be constrained, for instance by the conservation of the total amount of synaptic input. This role is believed to be fulfilled by a diversity of homeostatic mechanisms.

However, to effectively stabilize Hebbian plasticity, which can be induced in a matter of seconds to minutes, homeostatic plasticity has to react rapidly. This requirement, however, is not met by most forms of homeostatic plasticity, which typically act on timescales of hours, days or longer. This limitation does not seem to apply to heterosynaptic plasticity.

To achieve a homeostatic effect, and limit synapse instability, heterosynaptic plasticity serves its homeostatic role through pathway unspecific synaptic changes in the opposite direction of Hebbian plasticity. In other words, whenever homosynaptic long-term potentiation is induced at a given synapse, other unstimulated synapses should be depressed. Conversely, homosynaptic long-term depression would cause other synapses to potentiate in a manner which keeps the average synaptic weight approximately conserved. The scope of these changes could be global or compartmentalized in the dendrites. This theory of balancing the approximate dendritic activity locally, was proposed by Rabinowitch and Segev, and has been further exemplified by hippocampal neurons and neurons in the amygdala.

=== Developmental Plasticity ===
The development of neurons, specifically synapses from those almost entirely lacking vesicles pre-synaptically, and forming tight junctions with other neurons, to adult, chemical transmitting capable neurons, is a very long process executed by many biological functions, including contributions by plasticity. Early in development, synaptic connections are not input-specific, most likely because of Ca^{2+} spillover (i.e. Ca^{2+} is not restricted to dendrites specifically activated). This spillover represents another mechanism of heterosynaptic change in plasticity. Networks are later refined by input-specific plasticity, which allows for the elimination of connections that are not specifically stimulated. As neuronal circuits mature, it is likely that the concentration of Ca^{2+} binding proteins increases, which prevents Ca^{2+} from diffusing to other sites. Increases in localized Ca^{2+} lead to AMPARs inserted into the membrane. This increase in AMPA density in the postsynaptic membrane increases enables NMDARs to be functional, allowing more Ca^{2+} to enter the cell. NMDAR subunits also change as neurons mature, increasing the receptor's conductance property. These mechanisms facilitate Ca^{2+} location restriction, and thus specificity, as an organism progresses through development.

In addition to Ca^{2+} specific mechanisms, increasing total numbers of vesicles in the vesicle pool and extended action potential duration, in young organisms may contribute to observed changes in the same neurons at different ages. For example, studies of the stimulation of MNTB (Medial Nucleus of Trapezoid Body) neurons at a young age has been shown to create a short term depressive effect, however when repeated in mature MNTB neurons, this is not the case. Further possible mechanisms accounting for changes such as in the previous example, may be the alteration of depolarization and hyperpolarization amplitudes throughout development. For example, hyperpolarizing neurons producing Inhibitory Post Synaptic Potentials (IPSPs), became more hyperpolarized throughout development reaching more negative membrane potential values.

=== Synaptic Scaling ===
A neural network that undergoes plastic changes between synapses must initiate normalization mechanisms in order to combat unrestrained potentiation or depression. One such mechanism assures that the average firing rate of these neurons is kept at a reasonable rate through synaptic scaling. For example, inhibitory synapses are strengthened or excitatory synapses are weakened to normalize the neural network and allow single neurons to regulate their firing rate, maintaining proper overall synapse activation. Another mechanism is the cell-wide redistribution of synaptic weight. This mechanism conserves the total synaptic weight across the cell by introducing competition between synapses. Thus, normalizing a single neuron after plasticity. During development, cells can be refined when some synapses are preserved and others are discarded to normalize total synaptic weight. In this way, homeostasis is conserved in cells that are undergoing plasticity and normal operation of learning networks is also preserved, allowing new information to be learned. RAI1 influences synaptic scaling indirectly because it regulates gene expression in neurons, including genes involved in synaptic function and neuronal activity. Synaptic scaling depends on proper expression of proteins that adjust synaptic strength up or down to keep neural activity stable. When RAI1 (Retinoic Acid Induced 1) is reduced, this gene regulation is disrupted, which can affect the neuron's ability to maintain that balance and properly carry out homeostatic synaptic scaling NRP2 is involved in pathways that help regulate homeostatic synaptic scaling, which is the process neurons use to keep their activity stable by strengthening or weakening all synapses. When NRP2 (neuropilin-2) activity is reduced, it can lessen signals that promote synaptic downscaling (reducing synaptic strength), allowing synapses to remain stronger and improving neural communication. Decreased NRP2 after exercise may have supported a healthier balance of synaptic activity, making it easier for neurons to maintain stable firing while still adapting and learning.
