= Long-term depression =

In neurophysiology, a reduction of neuronal synapse efficacy

In neurophysiology, long-term depression (LTD) is an activity-dependent reduction in the efficacy of neuronal synapses lasting hours or longer following a long patterned stimulus. LTD occurs in many areas of the CNS with varying mechanisms depending upon brain region and developmental progress.

As the opposing process to long-term potentiation (LTP), LTD is one of several processes that serves to selectively weaken specific synapses in order to make constructive use of synaptic strengthening caused by LTP. This is necessary because, if allowed to continue increasing in strength, synapses would ultimately reach a ceiling level of efficiency, which would inhibit the encoding of new information. Both LTD and LTP are forms of synaptic plasticity.

== Characterisation ==
LTD in the hippocampus and cerebellum have been the best characterized, but there are other brain areas in which mechanisms of LTD are understood. LTD has also been found to occur in different types of neurons that release various neurotransmitters, however, the most common neurotransmitter involved in LTD is L-glutamate. L-glutamate acts on the N-methyl-D-aspartate receptors (NMDARs), α-amino-3-hydroxy-5-methylisoxazole-4-propionic acid receptors (AMPARs), kainate receptors (KARs), and metabotropic glutamate receptors (mGluRs) during LTD. It can result from strong synaptic stimulation (as occurs in the cerebellar Purkinje cells) or from persistent weak synaptic stimulation (as in the hippocampus). Long-term potentiation (LTP) is the opposing process to LTD; it is the long-lasting increase of synaptic strength. In conjunction, LTD and LTP are factors affecting neuronal synaptic plasticity. LTD is thought to result mainly from a decrease in postsynaptic receptor density, although a decrease in presynaptic neurotransmitter release may also play a role. Cerebellar LTD has been hypothesized to be important for motor learning. However, it is likely that other plasticity mechanisms play a role as well. Hippocampal LTD may be important for the clearing of old memory traces. Hippocampal/cortical LTD can be dependent on NMDA receptors, metabotropic glutamate receptors (mGluR), or endocannabinoids. The result of the underlying-LTD molecular mechanism in cerebellum is the phosphorylation of AMPA glutamate receptors and their elimination from the surface of the parallel fiber-Purkinje cell (PF-PC) synapse.

== Neural homeostasis ==
It is highly important for neurons to maintain a variable range of neuronal output. If synapses were only reinforced by positive feedback, they would eventually come to the point of complete inactivity or too much activity. To prevent neurons from becoming static, there are two regulatory forms of plasticity that provide negative feedback: metaplasticity and scaling. Metaplasticity is expressed as a change in the capacity to provoke subsequent synaptic plasticity, including LTD and LTP. The Bienenstock, Cooper and Munro model (BCM model) proposes that a certain threshold exists such that a level of postsynaptic response below the threshold leads to LTD and above it leads to LTP. BCM theory further proposes that the level of this threshold depends upon the average amount of postsynaptic activity. Scaling has been found to occur when the strength of all of a neuron's excitatory inputs are scaled up or down. LTD and LTP coincide with metaplasticity and synaptic scaling to maintain proper neuronal network function.

== General forms of LTD ==
Long-term depression can be described as either homosynaptic plasticity or heterosynaptic plasticity. Homosynaptic LTD is restricted to the individual synapse that is activated by a low frequency stimulus. In other words, this form of LTD is activity-dependent, because the events causing the synaptic weakening occur at the same synapse that is being activated. Homosynaptic LTD is also associative in that it correlates the activation of the postsynaptic neuron with the firing of the presynaptic neuron. Heterosynaptic LTD, in contrast, occurs at synapses that are not potentiated or are inactive. The weakening of a synapse is independent of the activity of the presynaptic or postsynaptic neurons as a result of the firing of a distinct modulatory interneuron. Thus, this form of LTD impacts synapses nearby those receiving action potentials.

== Mechanisms that weaken synapses ==
=== Hippocampus ===
LTD affects hippocampal synapses between the Schaffer collaterals and the CA1 pyramidal cells. LTD at the Schaffer collateral-CA1 synapses depends on the timing and frequency of calcium influx. LTD occurs at these synapses when Schaffer collaterals are stimulated repetitively for extended time periods (10–15 minutes) at a low frequency (approximately 1 Hz). Depressed excitatory postsynaptic potentials (EPSPs) result from this particular stimulation pattern. The magnitude of calcium signal in the postsynaptic cell largely determines whether LTD or LTP occurs. NMDA-receptor dependent LTD is induced by moderate rises in postsynaptic calcium levels. The threshold level in area CA1 is on a sliding scale that depends on the history of the synapse. If the synapse has already been subject to LTP, the threshold is raised, increasing the probability that a calcium influx will yield LTD. In this way, a "negative feedback" system maintains synaptic plasticity. Activation of NMDA-type glutamate receptors, which belong to a class of ionotropic glutamate receptors (iGluRs), is required for calcium entry into the CA1 postsynaptic cell. Change in voltage provides a graded control of postsynaptic Ca^{2+} by regulating NMDAR-dependent Ca^{2+} influx, which is responsible for initiating LTD.

While LTP is in part due to the activation of protein kinases, which subsequently phosphorylate target proteins, LTD arises from activation of calcium-dependent phosphatases that dephosphorylate the target proteins. Selective activation of these phosphatases by varying calcium levels might be responsible for the different effects of calcium observed during LTD. The activation of postsynaptic phosphatases causes internalization of synaptic AMPA receptors (also a type of iGluRs) into the postsynaptic cell by clathrin-coated endocytosis mechanisms, thereby reducing sensitivity to glutamate released by Schaffer collateral terminals.

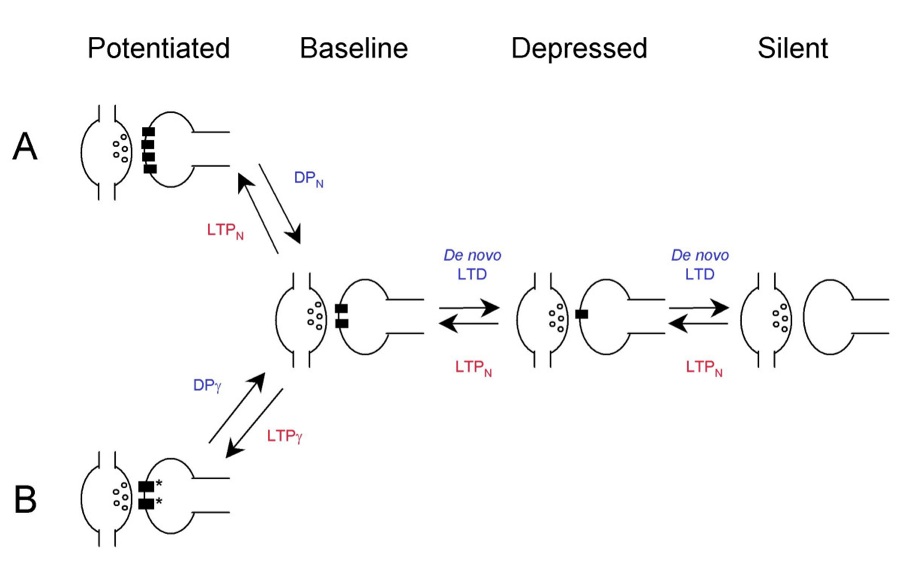
A model for the mechanisms of depotentiation and de novo LTD

=== Cerebellum ===
LTD occurs at synapses in cerebellar Purkinje neurons, which receive two forms of excitatory input, one from a single climbing fiber and one from hundreds of thousands of parallel fibers. LTD decreases the efficacy of parallel fiber synapse transmission, though, according to recent findings, it also impairs climbing fiber synapse transmission. Both parallel fibers and climbing fibers must be simultaneously activated for LTD to occur. With respect to calcium release however, it is best if the parallel fibers are activated a few hundred milliseconds before the climbing fibres. In one pathway, parallel fiber terminals release glutamate to activate AMPA and metabotropic glutamate receptors in the postsynaptic Purkinje cell. When glutamate binds to the AMPA receptor, the membrane depolarizes. Glutamate binding to the metabotropic receptor activates phospholipase C (PLC) and produces diacylglycerol (DAG) and inositol triphosphate (IP3) second messengers. In the pathway initiated by activation of climbing fibers, calcium enters the postsynaptic cell through voltage-gated ion channels, raising intracellular calcium levels. Together, DAG and IP3 augment the calcium concentration rise by targeting IP3-sensitive receptors triggering release of calcium from intracellular stores as well as protein kinase C (PKC) activation (which is accomplished jointly by calcium and DAG). PKC phosphorylates AMPA receptors, which promotes their dissociation from scaffold proteins in the post-synaptic membrane and subsequent internalization. With the loss of AMPA receptors, the postsynaptic Purkinje cell response to glutamate release from parallel fibers is depressed. Calcium triggering in the cerebellum is a critical mechanism involved in long-term depression. Parallel fibre terminals and climbing fibres work together in a positive feedback loop for invoking high calcium release. LTD is involved in predictive control exerted by cerebellar circuitry and cerebellar reserve.

==== Ca^{2+} involvement ====
Further research has determined calcium's role in long-term depression induction. While other mechanisms of long-term depression are being investigated, calcium's role in LTD is a defined and well understood mechanism by scientists. High calcium concentrations in the post-synaptic Purkinje cells is a necessity for the induction of long-term depression. There are several sources of calcium signaling that elicit LTD: climbing fibres and parallel fibres which converge onto Purkinje cells. Calcium signaling in the post-synaptic cell involved both spatial and temporal overlap of climbing fibre induced calcium release into dendrites as well as parallel fibre induced mGluRs and IP3 mediated calcium release. In the climbing fibres, AMPAR-mediated depolarization induces a regenerative action potential that spreads to the dendrites, which is generated by voltage-gated calcium channels. Paired with PF-mediated mGluR1 activation results in LTD induction. In the parallel fibres, GluRs are activated by constant activation of the parallel fibres which indirectly induces the IP3 to bind to its receptor (IP3) and activate calcium release from intracellular storage. In calcium induction, there is a positive feedback loop to regenerate calcium for long-term depression. Climbing and parallel fibres must be activated together to depolarize the Purkinje cells while activating mGlur1s. Timing is a critical component to CF and PF as well, a better calcium release involves PF activation a few hundred milliseconds before CF activity.

==== AMPAR phosphorylation ====
There is a series of signaling cascades, MAPK, in the cerebellum that plays a critical role in cerebellum LTD. The MAPK cascade is important in information processing within neurons and other various types of cells. The cascade includes MAPKKK, MAPKK, and MAPK. Each is dual phosphorylated by the other, MAPKKK dual phosphorylates MAPKK and in turn dual phosphorylates MAPK. There is a positive feedback loop that results from a simultaneous input of signals from PF-CF and increases DAG and Ca^{2+} in Purkinje dendritic spines. Calcium and DAG activate conventional PKC (cPKC), which then activates MAPKKK and the rest of the MAPK cascade. Activated MAPK and Ca^{2+} activate PLA2, AA and cPKC creating a positive feedback loop. Induced cPKC phosphorylates AMPA receptors and are eventually removed from the postsynaptic membrane via endocytosis. The timescale is for this process is approximately 40 minutes. Overall, the magnitude of the LTD correlates with AMPAR phosphorylation.

=== Striatum ===
The mechanisms of LTD differ in the two subregions of the striatum. LTD is induced at corticostriatal medium spiny neuron synapses in the dorsal striatum by a high frequency stimulus coupled with postsynaptic depolarization, coactivation of dopamine D1 and D2 receptors and group I mGlu receptors, lack of NMDA receptor activation, and endocannabinoid activation.

In the prelimbic cortex of the striatum, three forms or LTD have been established. The mechanism of the first is similar to CA1-LTD: a low frequency stimulus induces LTD by activation of NMDA receptors, with postsynaptic depolarization and increased postsynaptic calcium influx. The second is initiated by a high frequency stimulus and is arbitrated by presynaptic mGlu receptor 2 or 3, resulting in a long term reduction in the involvement of P/Q-type calcium channels in glutamate release. The third form of LTD requires endocannabinoids, activation of mGlu receptors and repetitive stimulation of glutamatergic fibers (13 Hz for ten minutes), resulting in a long-term decrease in presynaptic glutamate release. It is proposed that LTD in GABAergic striatal neurons leads to a long-term decrease in inhibitory effects on the basal ganglia, influencing the storage of motor skills.

=== Visual cortex ===
Long-term depression has also been observed in the visual cortex, and it is proposed to be involved in ocular dominance. Recurring low-frequency stimulation of layer IV of the visual cortex or the white matter of the visual cortex causes LTD in layer III. In this form of LTD, low-frequency stimulation of one pathway results in LTD only for that input, making it homosynaptic. This type of LTD is similar to that found in the hippocampus, because it is triggered by a small elevation in postsynaptic calcium ions and activation of phosphatases. LTD has also been found to occur in this fashion in layer II. A different mechanism is at work in the LTD that occurs in layer V. In layer V, LTD requires low frequency stimulation, endocannabinoid signaling, and activation of presynaptic NR2B-containing NMDA receptors.

It has been found that paired-pulse stimulation (PPS) induces a form of homosynaptic LTD in the superficial layers of the visual cortex when the synapse is exposed to carbachol (CCh) and norepinephrine (NE).

The magnitude of this LTD is comparable to that which results from low frequency stimulation, but with fewer stimulation pulses (40 PPS for 900 low frequency stimulations). It is suggested that the effect of NE is to control the gain of NMDA receptor-dependent homosynaptic LTD. Like norepinephrine, acetylcholine is proposed to control the gain of NMDA receptor-dependent homosynaptic LTD, but it is likely to be a promoter of additional LTD mechanisms as well.

=== Prefrontal cortex ===
The neurotransmitter serotonin is involved in LTD induction in the prefrontal cortex (PFC). The serotonin system in the PFC plays an important role in regulating cognition and emotion. Serotonin, in cooperation with a group I metabotropic glutamate receptor (mGluR) agonist, facilitates LTD induction through augmentation of AMPA receptor internalization. This mechanism possibly underlies serotonin's role in the control of cognitive and emotional processes that synaptic plasticity in PFC neurons mediates.

=== Perirhinal cortex ===
Computational models predict that LTD creates a gain in recognition memory storage capacity over that of LTP in the perirhinal cortex, and this prediction is confirmed by neurotransmitter receptor blocking experiments. It is proposed that there are multiple memory mechanisms in the perirhinal cortex. The exact mechanisms are not completely understood, however pieces of the mechanisms have been deciphered. Studies suggest that one perirhinal cortex LTD mechanism involves NMDA receptors and group I and II mGlu receptors 24 hours after the stimulus. The other LTD mechanism involves acetylcholine receptors and kainate receptors at a much earlier time, about 20 to 30 minutes after stimulus.

== Role of endocannabinoids ==
Endocannabinoids affect long-lasting plasticity processes in various parts of the brain, serving both as regulators of pathways and necessary retrograde messengers in specific forms of LTD. In addition, LTD and LTP initiated by endocannabinoids are often expressed at the presynaptic level due to the retrograde nature of endocannabinoids. In regard to retrograde signaling, cannabinoid receptors function widely throughout the brain in presynaptic inhibition. Endocannabinoid retrograde signaling has been shown to effect LTD at corticostriatal synapses and glutamatergic synapses in the prelimbic cortex of the nucleus accumbens (NAc), and it is also involved in spike-timing-dependent LTD in the visual cortex. Although endocannabinoid retrograde signaling has been shown to effect glutamatergic synapses, it can also effect GABAergic synapses with either hetero- or homosynaptic interactions. Endocannabinoids are implicated in LTD of inhibitory inputs (LTDi) within the basolateral nucleus of the amygdala (BLA) as well as in the stratum radiatum of the hippocampus. Additionally, endocannabinoids play an important role in regulating various forms of synaptic plasticity. They are involved in inhibition of LTD at parallel fiber Purkinje neuron synapses in the cerebellum and NMDA receptor-dependent LTD in the hippocampus.

== Spike timing-dependent plasticity ==
Spike timing-dependent plasticity (STDP) refers to the timing of presynaptic and postsynaptic action potentials. STDP is a form of neuroplasticity in which a millisecond-scale change in the timing of presynaptic and postsynaptic spikes will cause differences in postsynaptic Ca^{2+} signals, inducing either LTP or LTD. LTD occurs when postsynaptic spikes precede presynaptic spikes by up to 20-50 ms. Whole-cell patch clamp experiments "in vivo" indicate that post-leading-pre spike delays elicit synaptic depression. LTP is induced when neurotransmitter release occurs 5-15 ms before a back-propagating action potential, whereas LTD is induced when the stimulus occurs 5-15 ms after the back-propagating action potential. There is a plasticity window: if the presynaptic and postsynaptic spikes are too far apart (i.e., more than 15 ms apart), there is little chance of plasticity. The possible window for LTD is wider than that for LTP; this threshold depends on synaptic history.

When postsynaptic action potential firing occurs prior to presynaptic afferent firing, both presynaptic endocannabinoid (CB1) receptors and NMDA receptors are stimulated at the same time. Postsynaptic spiking alleviates the Mg^{2+} block on NMDA receptors. The postsynaptic depolarization will subside by the time an EPSP occurs, enabling Mg^{2+} to return to its inhibitory binding site. Thus, the influx of Ca^{2+} in the postsynaptic cell is reduced. CB1 receptors detect postsynaptic activity levels via retrograde endocannabinoid release.

STDP selectively enhances and consolidates specific synaptic modifications (signals), while depressing global ones (noise). This results in a sharpened signal-to-noise ratio in human cortical networks that facilitates the detection of relevant signals during information processing in humans.

== Astrocyte Aid in LTD ==
Previous research has strictly focused on the aspects of neuronal LTD, however, emerging studies have shown astrocyte contribution to LTD in tripartite synapses. Through release of gliotransmitters, astrocytes are able to modulate synaptic activity when extracellular calcium levels rise. Astrocytes are experimentally shown to be involved with NMDA receptor dependent LTD in the somatosensory cortex, hippocampus, prefrontal cortex, and VTA by releasing glutamate or D-serine (as gliotransmitters) post-endocannabinoid interaction. Studies have shown that astrocytes are required for STDP, as they are able to reuptake glutamate from synapses (passively) and exchanging molecules within synapses such as releasing ATP to increase the adenosine levels in synapses to prevent LTD and produce LTP. Some forms of STDP that occur with NMDA receptors and mGluRs have shown that astrocyte cooperation is necessary, especially on the synapses of parallel fibers onto Purkinje cells. Furthermore, experiments on pyramidal cells showed that spike-timing dependent LTD (t-LTD) is astrocyte dependent, with astrocytes needing intracellular calcium release as well as CB1 receptor activation via neural endocanabanoid release. Experimental reports also show that at different points of experimentation, astrocytic calcium release was modulated over various temporal differences, meaning that astrocytes sense the temporal difference and modify their own signaling. The reason as to how the astrocytic sensing is still to be discovered.

Other studies show that astrocytic calcium release and SNARE-dependent vesicle release is necessary for NMDAR dependent LTD. By using a calcium chelator, researchers were able to block astrocytic calcium release in hippocampal neurons, leading to the discovery that NMDAR dependent LTD was impaired in samples paired with the chelator. Another test to ensure the findings showed that knocking out IP3 type 2 receptors (primary receptor for astrocytic calcium mobilization) in mice impaired LTD with low frequency stimulation. SNARE machinery was found to release glutamate from astrocytes; when inhibiting this machinery, the communication between neurons and astrocytes mediated by glutamate were severed and the original low frequency stimulation method failed to produce significant LTD. It was also mentioned that astrocyte supported LTD was important for removal of AMPAR from the postsynaptic neurons.

When researchers tested p38α MAPK specifically, varying effects were seen. p38α MAPK has been implied to be a part of the LTD intercellular pathway as well as stress signaling. With various knockout experiments it was determined that astrocytic, not neuronal p38α MAPK was necessary for LTD, due to the fact that a knockout of neuronal p38α had no significant effect on LTD in hippocampal cultures. Although testing of SNARE machinery in astrocytes had been tested, further examination determined that p38α MAPK in astrocytes was shown to increase glutamate release during low frequency stimulation and therefore increase NMDAR-dependent LTD. To test in vivo, researchers gave mice a virus that either depleted neuronal or astrocytic p38α MAPK. Before the injection, mice were tested for freezing behavior by being shocked 5 times in a familiar area. Thirty days after the initial test, mice with the astrocytic virus showed the biggest fear response, which gave the conclusion that p38α deletion from astrocytes enhances long-term memory.

== Motor learning and memory ==
Long-term depression has long been hypothesized to be an important mechanism behind motor learning and memory. Cerebellar LTD is thought to lead to motor learning, and hippocampal LTD is thought to contribute to the decay of memory. However, recent studies have found that hippocampal LTD may not act as the reverse of LTP, but may instead contribute to spatial memory formation. Although LTD is now well characterized, these hypotheses about its contribution to motor learning and memory remain controversial.

Studies have connected deficient cerebellar LTD with impaired motor learning. In one study, metabotropic glutamate receptor 1 mutant mice maintained a normal cerebellar anatomy but had weak LTD and consequently impaired motor learning. However the relationship between cerebellar LTD and motor learning has been seriously challenged. A study on rats and mice proved that normal motor learning occurs while LTD of Purkinje cells is prevented by (1R-1-benzo thiophen-5-yl-2[2-diethylamino)-ethoxy] ethanol hydrochloride (T-588). Likewise, LTD in mice was disrupted using several experimental techniques with no observable deficits in motor learning or performance. These taken together suggest that the correlation between cerebellar LTD and motor learning may have been illusory.

Studies on rats have made a connection between LTD in the hippocampus and memory. In one study, rats were exposed to a novel environment, and homosynaptic plasticity (LTD) in CA1 was observed. After the rats were brought back to their initial environment, LTD activity was lost. It was found that if the rats were exposed to novelty, the electrical stimulation required to depress synaptic transmission was of lower frequency than without novelty. When the rat was put in a novel environment, acetylcholine was released in the hippocampus from the medial septum fiber, resulting in LTD in CA1. Therefore, it has been concluded that acetylcholine facilitates LTD in CA1.

LTD has been correlated with spatial learning in rats, and it is crucial in forming a complete spatial map. It suggested that LTD and LTP work together to encode different aspects of spatial memory.

New evidence suggests that LTP works to encode space, whereas LTD works to encode the features of space. Specifically, it is accepted that encoding of experience takes place on a hierarchy. Encoding of new space is the priority of LTP, while information about orientation in space could be encoded by LTD in the dentate gyrus, and the finer details of space could be encoded by LTD in the CA1.

=== Cocaine as a model of LTD in drug addiction ===
The addictive property of cocaine is believed to occur in the nucleus accumbens (NAc). After chronic cocaine use, the amount of AMPA receptors relative to NMDA receptors decreases in the medium spiny neurons in the NAc shell. This decrease in AMPA receptors is thought to occur through the same mechanism as NMDAR-dependent LTD, because this form of plasticity is reduced after cocaine use. After, the amount of AMPA receptors is ramped up in the NAc neurons during withdrawal. This is possibly due to homeostatic synaptic scaling. This increase in AMPA receptors causes a hyperexcitability in the NAc neurons (GABAergic MSNs). This leads to an increase of GABA release by projections from the NAc to the ventral tegmental area (VTA), making the dopaminergic neurons in the VTA less likely to fire, and thus resulting in the symptoms of withdrawal.

=== Alcohol as a model of LTD in Plasticity ===
In terms of addiction, alcohol has a similar effect on our brains as other drugs do, making the user feel pleasure or negate the user's negative state of mind (if present). The cycle of consuming alcohol can lead to alcohol addiction, and eventually alcohol use disorder (AUD). Studies show that NMDA receptors role in learning can be hindered by alcohol in three major regions: dorsal striatum, neocortex, and hippocampus. In particular, these studies show that LTD due to alcohol is found in the dorsal striatum and the hippocampus, with deficits in the neocortex being caused by white and grey-matter degradation. Although LTD in the dorsal striatum was found when exposed to high frequency stimulation, a simulation of alcohol tolerance and withdrawal resulted in LTP in the same region. The main consensus when researching the alcohol and its effects on the hippocampus is that of which LTP is inhibited and LTD is produced. Specifically, LTD was found after activation of NMDA receptors in the CA1 region of the hippocampus, with evidence that an inhibition of glutamatergic interactions cause the hippocampal deficits.

== Current research ==
Research on the role of LTD in neurological disorders such as Alzheimer's disease (AD) is ongoing. It has been suggested that a reduction in NMDAR-dependent LTD may be due to changes not only in postsynaptic AMPARs but also in NMDARs, and these changes are perhaps present in early and mild forms of Alzheimer-type dementia.

Additionally, researchers have recently discovered a new mechanism (which involves LTD) linking soluble amyloid beta protein (Aβ) with the synaptic injury and memory loss related to AD. While Aβ's role in LTD regulation has not been clearly understood, it has been found that soluble Aβ facilitates hippocampal LTD and is mediated by a decrease in glutamate recycling at hippocampal synapses. Excess glutamate is a proposed contributor to the progressive neuronal loss involved in AD. Evidence that soluble Aβ enhances LTD through a mechanism involving altered glutamate uptake at hippocampal synapses has important implications for the initiation of synaptic failure in AD and in types of age-related Aβ accumulation. This research provides a novel understanding of the development of AD and proposes potential therapeutic targets for the disease. Further research is needed to understand how soluble amyloid beta protein specifically interferes with glutamate transporters.

In relation to Alzheimer's disease, the structural protein Tau, has been found to have certain effects on LTD. Although an argument is made that Tau is only found in axons as a structural supporter, and the misfolding of it progresses the pathophysiology of AD, there has been compelling evidence that shows Tau is also found in dendrites. One of the post translational modifications (PTMs) of Tau is phosphorylation, which the protein is reliant on to fold into its correct states -- meaning hyperphosphorylation (part of the pathophysiology of AD) can change folding dynamics and damage neurons. Although the full mechanism has not been discovered, it has been found that hyperphosphorylation in Tau has been seen to weaken synapses and facilitates LTD by aggregation. Furthermore, comparing different sizes of aggregate Tau oligomers had no difference in effect as they all inhibited LTP and facilitated LTD.

In the field of research of cerebellum disorders, auto-antigens are involved in molecular cascades for induction of LTD of synaptic transmissions between parallel fibers (PFs) and Purkinje cells (PCs), a mechanism of synaptic plasticity in the cerebellum. Anti-VGCC, anti-mGluR1, and anti-GluR delta Abs-associated cerebellar ataxias share one common pathophysiological mechanism: a deregulation in PF-PC LTD. This causes an impairment of restoration or maintenance of the internal model hold by the cerebellum and triggers cerebellar ataxias. These diseases are LTDpathies.

The mechanism of long-term depression has been well characterized in limited parts of the brain. However, the way in which LTD affects motor learning and memory is still not well understood. Determining this relationship is presently one of the major focuses of LTD research.

=== Neurodegeneration ===
Neurodegenerative diseases research remains inconclusive as to the mechanisms that triggers the degeneration in the brain. New evidence demonstrates there are similarities between the apoptotic pathway and LTD which involves the phosphorylation/activation of GSK3β. NMDAR-LTD(A) contributes to the elimination of excess synapses during development. This process is downregulated after synapses have stabilized, and is regulated by GSK3β. During neurodegeneration, there is the possibility that there is deregulation of GSK3β resulting in 'synaptic pruning'. If there is excess removal of synapses, this illustrates early signs of neurodegeration and a link between apoptosis and neurodegeneration diseases.

== See also ==
- Brodmann area 25
- Hebbian theory
- BCM theory
- Electrical synapse
- Excitatory postsynaptic potential
- Homeostatic plasticity
- Inhibitory postsynaptic potential
- Long-term potentiation (LTP)
- Short-term synaptic depression
- Spike timing dependent plasticity (STDP)
- Neural Facilitation (Short-term plasticity)
- Neuroplasticity
- Postsynaptic potential
- Actin remodeling of neurons
