= Gina G. Turrigiano =

American neuroscientist

- Education: Reed College; University of California, San Diego
- Scientific career
- Fields: Neuroscience
- Workplaces: Brandeis University

Gina G. Turrigiano is an American neuroscientist. She is currently a Professor of Biology and the Levitan Chair of Vision Science at Brandeis University.

Gina was born in 1963.

== Professional work ==
Turrigiano is known for her pioneering work on the mechanisms that allow brain circuits to remain both flexible and stable. Turrigiano and colleagues discovered several forms of "homeostatic" plasticity, most notably Synaptic scaling and intrinsic homeostatic plasticity, and have characterized how these forms of plasticity contribute to learning and LTP/LTD allowing experience-dependent plastic changes in the brain.

== Education ==
She graduated from Reed College, B.A., and from University of California, San Diego, with a Ph.D.

== Personal ==
She now lives in greater Boston with her husband, Sacha Nelson (also a neuroscientist). She has two children, Riel Turrigiano Nelson, and Raphael Nelson Turrigiano.

== Notable awards and honors ==
- 2023 Landis Award for Outstanding Mentorship, NINDS
- 2023 Vallee Visiting Professorship
- 2022 President, Society for Neuroscience
- 2017 Fellow, American Association for the Advancement of Science
- 2015 Javitz Neuroscience Investigator Award
- 2013 Elected Member, National Academy of Sciences (USA)
- 2012 Elected Member, American Academy of Arts and Sciences (USA)
- 2012 HFSP Nakasone Award
- 2007 NIH Directors Pioneer Award
- 2000 MacArthur Fellows Program
- 1996 National Institutes of Health Career Development Award
- 1997 Alfred P. Sloan Foundation Fellowship

== Works ==
- "Homeostatic Regulation of Cortical Networks", Toward a theory of neuroplasticity, Editors Christopher Ariel Shaw, Jill McEachern, Psychology Press, 2001, ISBN 978-1-84169-021-6
- "Behavioral Correlates of Stomagrastric Network Function", Dynamic biological networks: the stomatogastric nervous system, Editor Ronald M. Harris-Warrick, MIT Press, 1992, ISBN 978-0-262-08214-3
- "Activity deprivation modulates the Shank3/Homer1/mGluR5 signaling pathway to enable synaptic upscaling", Andrea A Guerrero, Gina Turrigiano bioRxiv 2025.04.24.650518; doi: https://doi.org/10.1101/2025.04.24.650518

Turrigiano has published >100 research articles in her field, many of which can be found in Journals such as Cell, Neuron, Neuroscience, Proceedings of the National Academy of Sciences of the United States of America.

Her complete scholarship can be found here https://scholar.google.com/citations?user=lAjsH-wAAAAJ&hl=en
