= Didactic organisation =

Unidirectional influence between neurons

Didactic organisation is the ability of neurons within a network to impart their pattern of synaptic connectivity and/or response properties to other neurons. The term didactic is used because this kind of influence is unidirectional; each individual instance of didactic organisation between two connected neurons does not involve a bidirectional transfer of connectivity or response property information between them.

== Experimental and theoretical evidence ==
Evidence for didactic organisation in vivo was first discovered through research into synaptic reorganisation in primary visual cortex that compared the results of neuronal recording experiments and computational models. However, the tendency of spike-timing-dependent plasticity to separate neurons into ‘teachers’ and ‘students’ had previously been predicted in theory based on computational modelling results alone.

== Spike-timing-dependent plasticity ==
Didactic organisation is primarily a consequence of spike-timing-dependent plasticity, because when the neurons within an interconnected network undergo action potentials (or ‘spikes’) at approximately the same time (within the order of tens of milliseconds) the efferent synaptic connections of neurons that spike early will have their efficacy increased (long-term potentiation), while neurons that spike late will have the efficacy of their efferent synaptic connections decreased (long-term depression).

== Causal activity ==
While spike-timing-dependent plasticity is an essential ingredient for didactic organisation, other features of neuronal activity appear to be required for didactic organisation to occur in vivo. One of these features is that activity propagated through a network needs to have a 'causal' character. For example, chain of reciprocally connected neurons with this ‘causal activity’ characteristic would be capable of propagating a wave of spikes along its length, rather than the wave disintegrating into a cascade of spikes ‘bouncing’ back and forth between neurons in the chain.

== Activity propagation ==
A third important feature for didactic organisation in vivo concerns the spatial scale of spike propagation within a network. While it is expected that didactic organisation will always be present among neurons that exhibit spike timing-dependent plasticity and causal activity (see above), the spatial scale over which didactic organisation can occur between neurons within a network should be limited by the spatial scale of spike propagation. Evidence suggests that the scale of spike propagation can be actively controlled by adjusting the balance of excitation and inhibition within a network (a balance that can be modulated by synaptic scaling, for example), thus providing a means by which a network can actively control when and to what extent didactic organisation can occur. For this reason, and the very specific connectivity patterns that can be achieved via didactic organisation, it has been speculated that didactic organisation may play an important role in brain development.

== See also ==
- Synaptic plasticity
- Spike-timing-dependent plasticity
