= Homeostatic plasticity =

Capacity of neurons to regulate their own excitability relative to network activity

Modern neuroscience has increasingly noted the importance of neuroplasticity in nervous system development. In summary, neuroplasticity is defined as the brain's ability to adapt the structure and function of its own neurons to the external changes in the environment, supporting processes such as learning, memory creation, healing from injury, and overall development. Traditional Hebbian plasticity, which is the most well-studied form of neuroplasticity, states that repeated action and experiences strengthen synapses (long-term potentiation) and lack of action and experiences weaken or diminish synapses (long-term depression). However, this can lead to potential instability in the nervous system, where synapses and nerves can saturate to either extremes, either firing constantly or not firing at all. In response, the nervous system can also perform homeostatic plasticity. Being a subset of neuroplasticity, homeostatic plasticity specifically acts as the brain's "self-correcting" counterforce. It acts as the nervous system's "thermostat", bringing neural activity back to specific balanced set point when it becomes too high or too low in certain regions of the brain.

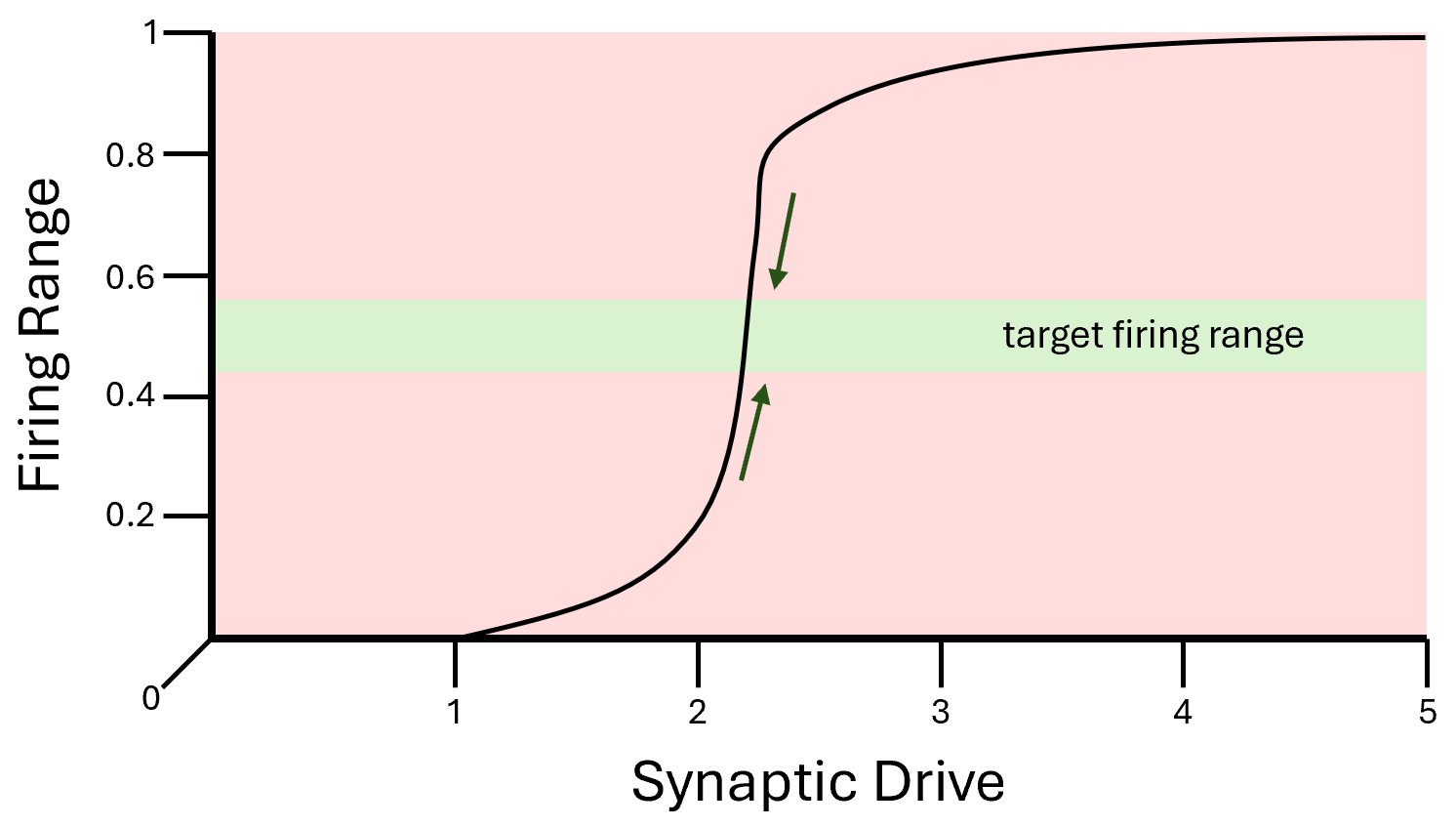
The figure above details the relationship between synaptic drive and firing rate for a single neuron. As synaptic drive increases and firing rate rises above the target level, homeostatic mechanisms reduce the strength of the inputs which works to move the neuron back into the target zone. On the other hand, if synaptic drive falls too low and firing rate falls below the target rate, the homeostatic plasticity process will increase the strength of all inputs and bring the neuron back to the target firing zone. This shows how homeostatic neuroplasticity acts as the nervous system's internal "thermostat".

Homeostatic plasticity is the capacity of neurons to regulate their own excitability relative to network activity. The term homeostatic plasticity derives from two opposing concepts: homeostatic (a product of the Greek words for "same" and "state" or "condition") and plasticity (or "change"), thus homeostatic plasticity means "staying the same through change". In the nervous system, the neural circuit has to remain stable in function through a variety of fluctuating changes that occur in the number and strength of synaptic connections. Thus, neurons must be able to keep track of and evolve with their changing environment while ensuring there is stability on the functional and structural level. Hebbian neuroplasticity (the neuroplasticity that causes long-term potentiation and long-term depression) creates changes that pushes neural circuits away from equilibrium, and it is important to ensure that stability is still maintained for neurons to maintain their activity and functionality. Neurons need to have flexibility to adapt to changes in the connectivity and synaptic strength during development and learning, but they must also have a system in place to keep them in check. This is the purpose of homeostatic plasticity: the neuronal networks use a complex set of regulatory mechanisms to achieve homeostasis over a wide range of temporal and spatial scales. Whenever there is a perturbation to the nervous system, such as a synaptic connection or neural circuit that is over-excited to the point of harm, homeostatic plasticity mechanisms are triggered and circuit functions are stabilized.

Homeostatic plasticity acts as a negative feedback mechanism. Since this mechanism is used to offset the excessive excitation or inhibition through adjusting the synaptic strength of the neurons, it maintains stability by reversing a change.

Homeostatic plasticity has its own mechanism, subtypes, and comparators. Additionally, homeostatic plasticity can be connected to the nervous system by exploring its general purpose and roles in the system, specifically with central pattern generators and in neurological disorders. The remainder of this article will cover all important facets needed for thorough understanding homeostatic plasticity and the implication it has on clinical diseases and future research, including the topics mentioned above.

== Mechanisms ==
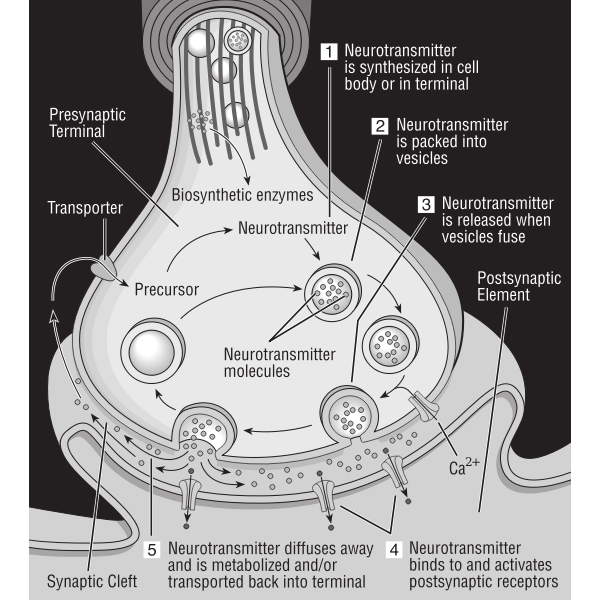
Important structures of the synapse relevant to mechanisms underlying homeostatic plasticity are shown in the diagram

While the way that homeostatic plasticity is induced is still being studied, there are many ongoing research projects and past projects that have uncovered details on the mechanisms that allow the negative feedback loop of homeostatic plasticity to take place. Key findings suggest that two main mechanisms behind homeostatic plasticity are intrinsic excitability and synaptic efficacy.

Synaptic scaling has been labeled as a potential mechanism of homeostatic plasticity. Homeostatic plasticity is often used to describe a process that maintains stability of neuronal functions through a coordinated plasticity among subcellular compartments, such as the synapses versus the neurons and the cell bodies versus the axons. Synaptic scaling aids in that regulation of neurons as the role of synaptic scaling is to adjust the strength of neuron's excitatory synapses, helping to keep the neurons in check so homeostatic plasticity can achieve its function properly. In 2021, it was proposed that homeostatic synaptic scaling may play a role in establishing the specificity of an associative memory.

In 2025, it was found that the protein LARGE plays a significant role in homeostatic resetting of Hebbian plasticity through the downregulation of AMPA-receptor trafficking in the Golgi apparatus. Other studies have stated that phosphorylation is another method in which homeostatic plasticity can be stimulated.

Research has also shown that heterosynaptic plasticity can act as an underlying mechanism for homeostatic plasticity in undoing the positive-feedback loop effects of Hebbian plasiticity.

Homeostatic plasticity also uses a separate mechanism to help maintain neuronal excitability in a real-time manner through the coordinated plasticity of threshold and refractory period at voltage-gated sodium channels, keeping them balanced so the barrier remains constant for stable firing actions.

Homeostatic plasticity can also be mediated by extracellular signals such as BDNF or TNF-α. These factors are released in an activity-dependent manner and can regulate both excitatory and inhibitory synapses across neurons, contributing to circuit-wide homeostatic adjustments.

There is often an overlap between the mechanisms behind homeostatic plasticity and the sub-types of homeostatic plasticity, as the sub-types play an important role in ensuring that homeostasis is achieved within neural networks.

== Sub-types ==
Homeostatic plasticity serves to keep neuronal circuits in the appropriate range of activity for proper functioning. Homeostatic synaptic plasticity can be shown in presynaptic alterations, postsynaptic receptor expression, changes in intrinsic characteristics, synaptic scaling, structural homeostatic plasticity, and metaplasticity.

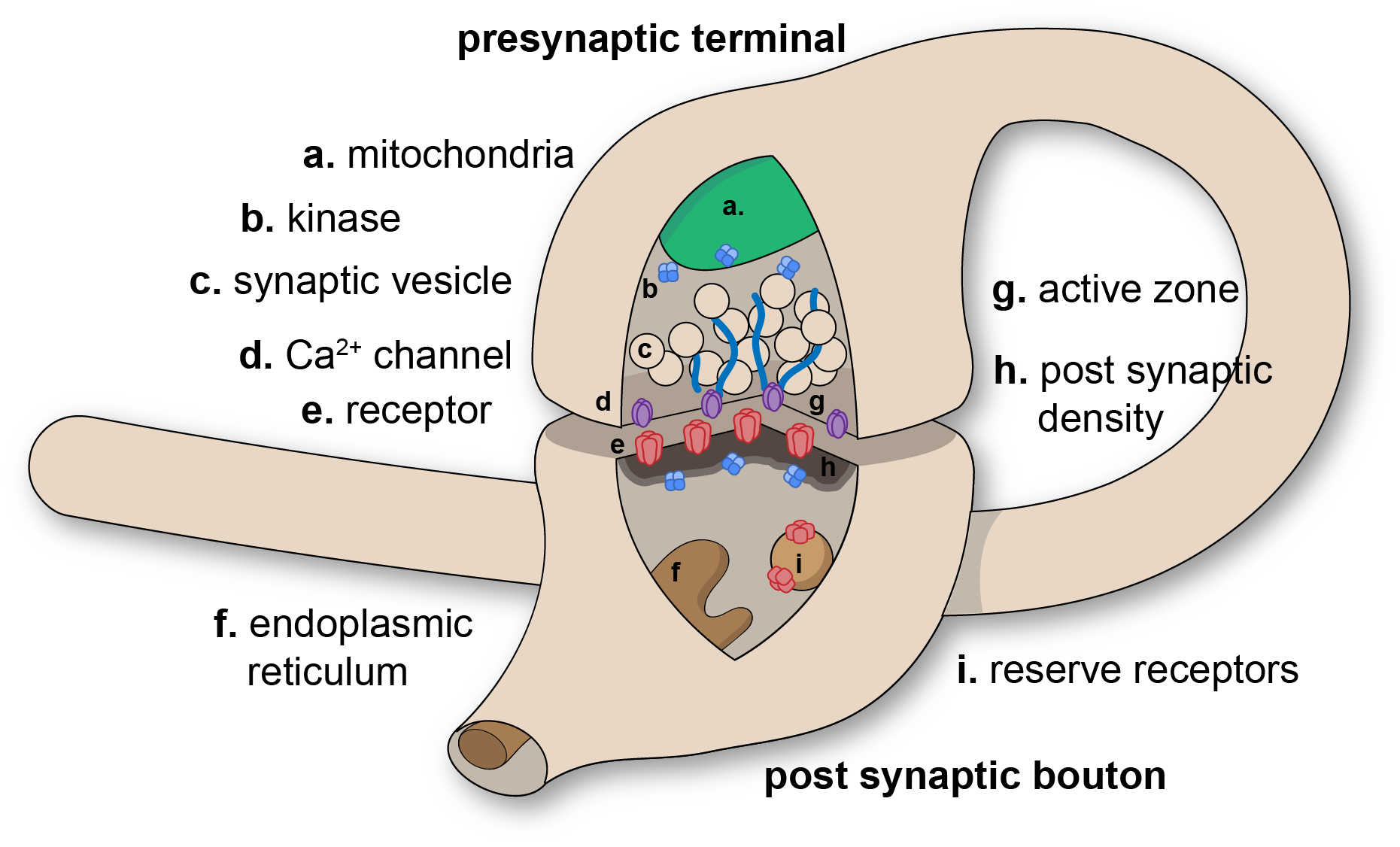
Presynaptic terminal

=== Homeostatic presynaptic plasticity ===
Homeostatic presynaptic plasticity is the ability of neurons to regulate neurotransmitter release at presynaptic terminals, ensuring a steady range of brain activity. This process involves various mechanisms, such as quantal size adjustment, differential expression of presynaptic proteins, and modification of vesicle recycling. Quantal size adjustment helps maintain steady postsynaptic responses despite changes in synaptic strength. Differential expression of presynaptic proteins, such as calcium channels or synaptic vesicle proteins, can also be altered by neurons to affect neurotransmitter release rate.

=== Homeostatic postsynaptic plasticity ===
Homeostatic postsynaptic plasticity is crucial for maintaining consistent levels of synaptic activity in neurons, which are formed at specific synapses in the brain. Homeostatic processes involve changes in the expression of receptors, changes in receptor sub-unit composition, and changes to intracellular signaling pathways. For example, the NMDA receptor can change its sub-unit composition to improve sensitivity to neurotransmitters. Additionally, changes in the expression and location of neurotransmitter receptors can impact synaptic transmission when specific signaling pathways are activated. Synaptic adhesion molecules can also be influenced by homeostatic processes. Overall, homeostatic postsynaptic plasticity contributes to the stability and proper functioning of neural circuits, allowing the brain to adapt to changing conditions without compromising the overall stability of neuronal activity.

=== Homeostatic intrinsic plasticity ===
Homeostatic intrinsic plasticity refers to the ability of neurons to change their intrinsic electrical characteristics in response to changes in synaptic or network activity. This process involves alterations in the excitability or firing characteristics of individual neurons, rather than primarily adjusting synaptic strength. Intrinsic plasticity processes associated with homeostasis include ion channel expression alterations, membrane conductance modifications, action potential threshold alterations, and regulation of intrinsic excitability. Neurons can up-regulate the expression of sodium channels to maintain firing rates and increase excitability in case of a drop in synaptic activity. These changes impact the input-output link between neurons and the homeostatic control of neuronal activity.

=== Synaptic scaling ===
Synaptic scaling is a homeostatic mechanism that allows neurons to modulate the strength of all synapses to maintain stable activity levels within a specific range. This process is characterized by changes in the quantity or sensitivity of neurotransmitter receptors on the postsynaptic membrane. Neurons can reduce the number of neurotransmitter receptors in response to network activity spikes, reducing synaptic strength, or increase the density in response to network activity drops, increasing sensitivity and boosting synaptic strength. This homeostatic regulation of brain circuits supports other types of synaptic plasticity, such as long-term depression and long-term potentiation.

=== Homeostatic structural plasticity ===
Structural homeostatic plasticity is another subtype of homeostatic plasticity, and is a homeostatic mechanism that involves structurally remodeling neural circuits, such as forming, pruning, or altering synaptic size, in order to maintain stability within the network's activity. While it seems similar to synaptic scaling, it is different in the sense that synaptic scaling acts on the strength or weight of existing synapses, while homeostatic structural plasticity acts on the number of synapses. In a paper published in July 2025, it was found that synaptic scaling and structural homeostatic plasticity work hand-in-hand. In the study, mouse hippocampal tissue cultures were used to block AMPA receptors in two different doses. Results showed that a partial blockage of the AMPA receptors increased the spine density, whereas a complete blockage resulted in decreased spine density. This showed that there is not a linear relationship between neural activity and dendritic spine numbers; instead, it is biphasic (U-shaped) and dependent on the degree of inhibition. This biphasic result is related to structural homeostatic plasticity because it shows how the subtypes of homeostatic structural plasticity and synaptic scaling work together to govern the number of synapses and the strength of synapses to provide control over the homeostasis of neural circuits.

=== Metaplasticity ===
Sometimes called the "plasticity of plasticity", metaplasticity is when a neuron or synapse's past activity changes the capacity it has for future plasticity. Instead of directly changing synaptic strength or working in the pre-synaptic or post-synaptic sense, it works on a higher level to shift the threshold at which future long-term potentiation of long-term depression can be triggered. Thus, it inhibits repeated excitability or degradation of synaptic connections through Hebbian neuroplasticity, and works as both a sub-type and mechanism of homeostatic plasticity.

== Comparison to other types of plasticity ==
At a high-level, homeostatic plasticity works to restore neural activity back towards a "set point" in order to promote stability of the nervous system and homeostasis, whereas more other forms of plasticity center around producing and promoting change and adaptability in the nervous system and synaptic connections.

=== Hebbian plasticity ===
Homeostatic synaptic plasticity is a means of maintaining the synaptic basis for learning, respiration, and locomotion, in contrast to the Hebbian plasticity associated with learning and memory. Although Hebbian forms of plasticity, such as long-term potentiation and long-term depression occur rapidly, homeostatic plasticity (which relies on protein synthesis) can take hours or days. Homeostatic plasticity is thought to balance Hebbian plasticity by modulating the activity of the synapse or the properties of ion channels.

=== Functional plasticity ===
Functional plasticity is a type of plasticity that allows the brain the ability to adapt to changes in its functions with changes in their environment. At every point in the child's life, their brain is able to balance malleable processes that represent neural plasticity and promote the change with homeostatic process in order to promote stability. This means that regardless of a child's brain development as a fetus, typical brain development or atypical brain development, can depend on their environment.

The functions and abilities of a certain part of the brain can be moved to another part of the brain when damaged. When a fetus is developing, this type of plasticity occurs rapidly establishing the brain systems.

=== Structural plasticity ===
Structural plasticity refers to morphological changes in the structure of the brain through the growth of new synaptic connections. This process is done through synaptogenesis, neuronal migration, and neurogenesis. These processes are a foundational part of fetal neuron development, but have also been found in adult brains. Neurogenesis occurs in the ventricular or subventricular zone of the brain. Neural migration is the process of neurons traveling from these zones towards their final destination in development. Synaptic remodeling in response to learning and memory lead to function consequences in the brain throughout life.

=== Developmental plasticity ===
Another broad umbrella of plasticity is developmental plasticity. It is generally defined as an organism's ability to develop in regards to the environment that it is in, allowing for one encoded genotype to result in multiple phenotypes in the developmental process. The mechanism underlying this type of plasticity is the brain and nervous system's ability to adapt to experience and the environment, even if it opposes the genetic composition of an individual. Ultimately, these phenotypic changes can influence later health outcomes and the passing on of certain traits to the next generation.

== Role in central pattern generators ==
Homeostatic plasticity is also important in the context of central pattern generators. Central pattern generators control rhythmic and repeating pattern. Moreover, central pattern regulators are crucial for vital functions (i.e. respiration and digestion) and any disruptions can cause immense consequences. Central pattern generators maintain their rhythmic activity through homeostatic regulation using various intrinsic and network properties. One example of an intrinsic neuronal property is ion channel expression. For instance, neuron activity is influenced by the expression of ion channel levels. Moreover, changes in membrane voltage are used as feedback signals and those signals can modify the effects of the ion channels. Furthermore, the changes allow neurons to adjust and maintain stable activity patterns with various inputs. An example of a network property is synaptic reorganization. Synaptic reorganization refers to the formation and elimination of neuron connections that change synapse function and is key in brain plasticity. Overall, homeostatic plasticity is important for central pattern generators, as neuronal properties are modulated in response to environmental changes in order to maintain an appropriate and balanced neural output.

== Role in neurological disorders ==
The biological system needs to remain in homeostasis in order to function properly. Disease occurs when homeostasis is lost and biological extremes are favored. As such, a large number of neurological disorders can arise from a lack of homeostasis, and specific malfunctioning of homeostatic plasticity. This can happen in two main ways: through a genetic mutation that directly (through a mechanism or sub-type) impairs the negative feedback system of homeostatic plasticity, or if homeostatic plasticity becomes maladaptive, meaning compensations to fix organizational weaknesses result in destabilization.

This dysfunction is what contributes to a large number of neurological disorders. These include epilepsy, autism spectrum disorder, Alzheimer's disease, addiction, depression, other neurodegenerative diseases, genetic disorders, and schizophrenia. In these disorders, neurons ability to maintain stability in response to changes in activity levels or external stimuli is often altered. Understanding how pathologies with homeostatic plasticity causes neurodegenerative and behavioral disorders is a crucial step in establishing treatment plans and furthering preventative medicine in regards to this field.

=== Epilepsy ===
In a healthy brain, neuronal excitability and synaptic strength are homeostatically regulated to maintain balance between excitation and inhibition. In epilepsy, this process can become semi-uncontrolled through damage to Narp, leading to excessive neural excitability. This can cause an event where after prolonged network inactivity and/or brain injuries, neurons may become more active to compensate for the irregularity, which can cause the person to be more prone to seizures. Homeostatic plasticity is essential for normal brain function, the overcompensation due to brain dysregulation can contribute to the epileptic activity, highlighting its complex role in both stability and dysfunction. There are ways to attempt to regulate the over-excitability, such as cortical stimulation which increases controlled activity and might decrease excessive excitability, achieving the balance homeostatic plasticity seeks. Some studies also show that electrical stimulation helps those who suffer from drug-resistant epilepsy. Traditional pharmacological approaches may be ineffective in restoring physiological balance in the neuronal network. However, therapeutic strategies targeting homeostatic plasticity mechanisms may offer a potential solution.

=== Autism spectrum disorder ===
Autism spectrum disorder is a neurodevelopment disorder that is characterized by repetitive patterns of behavior, along with difficulties in social interaction and communication. Dysregulation of homeostatic plasticity and neural imbalance can contribute to the cognitive and behavioral symptoms associated with autism. Sensory inputs and intrinsic brain activity can cause long-term changes in synaptic efficiency and eventually lead to an increase or decrease in the ratio between excitatory and inhibitory neurotransmissions is found in Autism. Alterations in the expression of synaptic proteins that regulate excitatory or inhibitory leads to dysfunction as the ratio changes. An example linked to autism is Neuroligins 1-4. Neuroligin 1 is mainly present in excitatory synapses, neuroligin 2 is more present in inhibitory synapses, and neuroligin 3 is present in both. Neuroligin 4 is present in glycinergic synapses which are major contributors to the regulation of neuronal excitability as they control fluxes of sensory information. Mutations in neuroligins 3 & 4 have been shakily linked to autism, but neuroligins 1-3 have been found to cause primary inhibitory dysfunction in autism. Pruning of developing synapses in the central nervous system regulates brain size and shape into the third decade of life. It is a necessary process to keep the brain from being too small or large. Underpruning has been associated autism and results in enlarged brain size due to overgrowth of dendrites from the lack of pruning and modification of neuron number. Motor impairment in autism has been linked specifically to an abundance of white matter in the primary motor cortex. Due to 22q11.2 gene deletion syndrome, found to be connected to autism spectrum disorder, both thicker and thinner cortical regions along with regions of increased cerebral cortex folding can be found in the brain. Environmental factors that effect normal homeostasis are heightened in autism, stopping neurons from maintaining optimum levels of activity.

=== Alzheimer's disease ===
In Alzheimer's disease, synaptic function and neuronal integrity are impaired. In a healthy brain, these mechanisms are tightly maintained by homeostatic plasticity. In the brain, there are constant changes in synaptic input. Therefore, neurons use homeostatic plasticity to keep their activity stable and prevents neurons from becoming too excited or too quiet. According to researchers, if a neuron does not receive enough activity, the synapses become stronger by adding receptors that help transmit signals. On the other hand, researchers argue that if the neuron receives too much activity the neuron will remove the receptors and weaken the synaptic connection. Researchers describe the regulation of receptors as synaptic scaling. In addition, neurons are able to adjust their intrinsic excitability and the changes help maintain the stability of neuron firing rates. Therefore, homeostatic plasticity potentially plays a significant role in neural stability. Deficits in homeostatic plasticity contribute to cognitive decline and memory impairment which are characteristic symptoms of Alzheimer's disease.

=== Addiction ===
Homeostatic plasticity plays a role in causing addiction as well. This is largely due to the maladaptive nature of homeostatic plasticity. It can occur with any sort of addictive substance, but the following example will cover drugs that are commonly abused, since they usually have a stronger effect because they cause excessive neural activation, and resulting hypoactivity when the drug wears off. When drugs are first taken, it triggers homeostatic plasticity due to the excessive neural activation and the immediate hypoactivity. Homeostatic plasticity works to counteract this disturbance by strengthening excitatory connections during withdrawal. This is an example of maladaptive homeostasis, where the nervous system tries to compensate for an inefficiency, but instead causes more damage. Here, the damage occurs because the neural networks that are responsible for craving the drug (or addictive substance) are also enhanced, and the addiction becomes stronger. The specific homeostatic maladaptations are manifested in the nucleus accumbens, and are associated with AMPA recruitment and membrane plasticity.

=== Depression ===
Homeostatic plasticity plays a role in causing depression, and can also assist in treating depression. Homeostatic plasticity plays a role in depression pathology because failed homeostatic plasticity, or even a significant lack of it, can result in an inability to stabilize neural activity, which leads to weakened synapses, resulting in forms of depression. Additionally, chronic stress can damage neurons in the prefrontal cortex, and if homeostatic plasticity is not used to reset the structure and function of these neurons, this atrophy creates room for disease. Imbalanced networks with a decrease in synaptic connectivity in areas such as the hippocampus and the prefrontal cortex but increased plasticity in areas like the amygdala can alter the balance between emotions and logical thought formation, thus resulting in depressive states. Lastly, inflammation of the microglia can cause disfunction of homeostatic plasticity, prompting depressive episodes as well.

Homeostatic plasticity can be utilized in treatment practices for clinical depression through multiple mechanisms. Primarily, drugs like ketamine that act as an NMDA receptor antagonist have been shown to have rapid antidepressant effects by engaging homeostatic mechanisms such as rapid synaptic upscaling through pathways like the mTORC1 signaling pathway. This ketamine-induced signaling can also increase synaptogenesis (creation of synapses) in the pre-frontal cortex, which can compensate for stress-related damage done to homeostatic plasticity mechanisms and neurons. There is also medicine and prescriptions that work to therapeutically establish new and healthy homeostatic set points in neural networks that had previously lost synaptic function.

=== Neurodegenerative diseases ===
Several neurological disorders are affected by homeostatic plasticity. Dysregulation of homeostatic plasticity can cause an excitatory or inhibitory network activity. Parkinson's disease, Huntington's disease, and ALS are all examples of disorders where dysregulation of neuronal networks contributes to the pathophysiology of the disorders. For instance, synaptic impairments occur early in ALS, so the early chances may serve as a method to counteract neuron dysfunction. Although the nervous system does attempt to adapt using synaptic plasticity, the attempts to maintain neural function are most times temporary and may eventually become harmful. For example, researchers believe that the spinal cord attempts to adapt by increasing the size of synaptic contacts, such as glutamatergic synapses to preserve motor function before the disease becomes detrimental. However, the increased excitatory synaptic activity becomes too excessive and leads to excitotoxicity. Thus, the neurodegenerative disease progresses further.

Other neurodegenerative diseases that are caused by damage to genes or molecules required for homeostatic synaptic signaling include migraines, ataxia, ADHD, and (damage to Ca2+ channels); intellectual disabilities (damage to FMRP); tuberous sclerosis complex (damage to mTOR/elF4E); myasthenia gravis (damage to acetylcholine receptors); Tourette's syndrome (damage to neurexin and neuroligin); and Warburg Micro and Martsolf Syndrome (damage to Rab3GAP).

=== Genetic disorders ===
Another way that neurodegenerative diseases can be caused by a maladaptive mechanism is when homeostatic plasticity fails to adapt the nervous system to genetic defects that can arise during development. A clear example of this is Angelman syndrome, which is a neurodevelopmental disorder that results from mutations on chromosome 15. The specific mutation, which is a loss the UBE3A gene, impairs homeostatic plasticity by damaging Arc/Arg3.1. As a result, improper synaptic scaling leads to hyper-excitability within neural circuits, causing intellectual disability, speech impairment, gait ataxia, and other symptoms. Another genetic disorder of a similar accord is Rett syndrome, which is caused by a mutation in the MECP2 gene. This mutation is responsible for helping neurons adjust to activity changes, thereby maintaining homeostatic plasticity. With the loss of function mutation, homeostatic plasticity is impaired, and patients suffer symptoms of loss of mobility in the hands, slowed brain growth, problems with walking, and more. Fragile X syndrome is also a neurodegenerative disorder that is caused by a impairment to synaptic scaling and homeostatic plasticity through the inactivation of the FMR1 gene that is responsible for retinoic acid signaling through FMRP. Studies have shown that repairing the mutation has restored the signaling and opened doors to potential treatment opportunities.

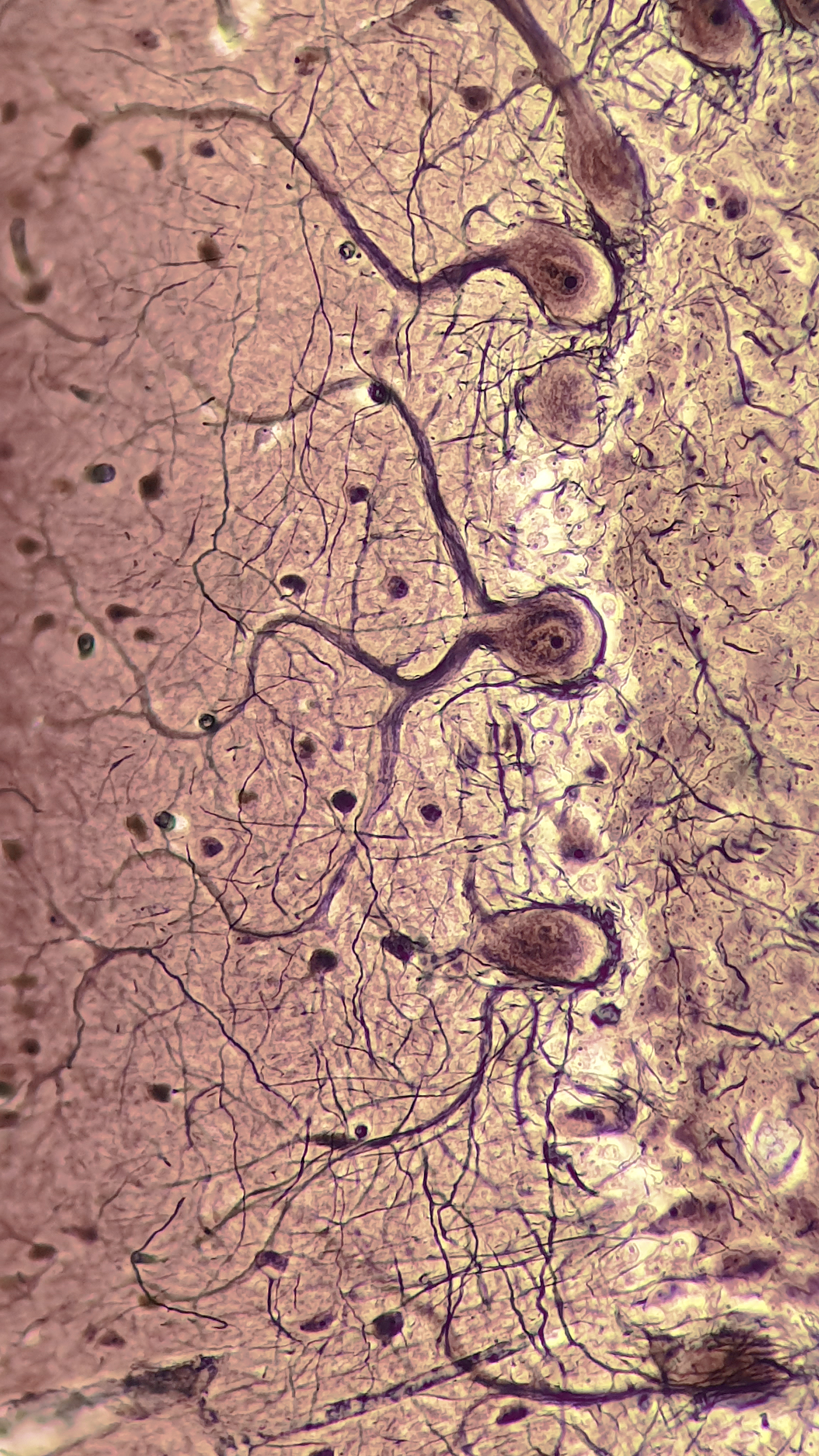
Purjunkie cells in neurons

=== Schizophrenia ===
Schizophrenia is characterized by disruptions in thought processes, perceptions, and emotions. Alterations in synaptic strength and connectivity due to dysregulation in homeostatic mechanisms lead to the symptoms observed in schizophrenic patients, specifically in problems with dysbindin. This dysregulation contribute to the cognitive deficits and delusions observed in schizophrenia. In fact, a study was conducted to prove that disturbance in the homeostasis of Purkinje cells is an example of how developmental plasticity homeostasis is crucial in preventing mental illnesses like Schizophrenia. Purkinje cells are neurons located in the cerebellum and are involved in cognitive functions. Moreover, research has shown that Purkinje cells keep the brain's activity stable after traumatic experiences, and unregulated responses to trauma disrupt normal brain activity, which leads to mental illnesses.

== Prominent researchers and next steps ==
Gina G. Turrigiano is an American neuroscientist known for her work on homeostatic plasticity mechanisms in the brain. Her research focused on synaptic strength and intrinsic excitability of neurons. Turrigiano discovered and characterized several types of homeostatic plasticity, most notably Synaptic scaling and intrinsic homeostatic plasticity. She considers homeostatic plasticity as how brains "tune themselves up" to remain dynamic and stable. More recently, she and her colleagues have been working to uncover the role of homeostatic plasticity in the development of the neocortex, in tandem with long-term potentiation and long-term depression, through experience-dependent refinement and learning.

Sacha Nelson is also an American biologist who works at Brandeis University alongside Turrigiano, and collaborated with her on homeostatic plasticity studies.

Grae Davis is another important researcher at UCSF and has looked into homeostatic plasticity mechanisms, specifically with presynaptic plasticity.

Research is actively being done to continue exploring the mechanisms behind homeostatic plasticity and how they can be artificially stimulated by medicine to create treatments for the pathologies that an impairment to homeostatic plasticity can cause.
