= Synaptic scaling =

Form of homeostatic plasticity

In neuroscience, synaptic scaling (or homeostatic scaling) is a form of homeostatic plasticity, in which the brain responds to chronically elevated activity in a neural circuit with negative feedback, allowing individual neurons to reduce their overall action potential firing rate. Where Hebbian plasticity mechanisms modify neural synaptic connections selectively, synaptic scaling normalizes all neural synaptic connections by decreasing the strength of each synapse by the same factor (multiplicative change), so that the relative synaptic weighting of each synapse is preserved.

== Cellular components involved ==
1. (Chemical) Synaptic connection: At chemical synapses, pre-synaptic neurons release vesicles containing neurotransmitters into the synaptic cleft. The extracellular neurotransmitters then interact with particular post-synaptic transmembrane protein receptors to allow a fraction of the neurotransmitters into the post-synaptic neuron.
2. Pre-synaptic vesicles : Vesicles are the means of chemical-synaptic plasticity. Pre-synaptic neurons relay information (in the form of neurotransmitters) to post-synaptic neurons via vesicles. The neurotransmitters inside vesicles are transported to the synaptic cleft where they interact with neurotransmitter specific post-synaptic protein receptors.
3. Glutamate: Glutamate is the primary excitatory neurotransmitter within vertebrates and plays a large role in synaptic plasticity. Stimulus to the pre-synaptic neurons triggers glutamate release into the synaptic cleft via pre-synaptic vesicle release. Once in the synaptic cleft, glutamate can bind and activate post-synaptic glutamatergic protein receptors such as NMDA and AMPA receptors.
4. Post-synaptic AMPA receptor: AMPA Receptors are trans-membrane protein ionotropic receptors that open and close quickly and are responsible for fast excitatory synaptic communication in the central nervous system. AMPA receptors have four subunits that glutamate can bind to. Depending on the AMPA receptor subunit compositions, the receptor can be permeable to cations such as calcium, sodium, or potassium

=== Interactions ===
Synaptic scaling is a post-synaptic homeostatic plasticity mechanism that takes place with changes in the quantity of AMPA receptors at a post-synaptic terminal (the tip of the dendrite belonging to the post-synaptic neuron that meets with the tip of an axon belonging to the pre-synaptic neuron) of a neuron. This closed-loop process gives a neuron the ability to have global negative feedback control of synaptic strength of all its synaptic connections by altering the probability of glutamate (the most common excitatory neurotransmitter) making contact with post-synaptic AMPA receptors. Therefore, a neuron's ability to modulate the quantity of post-synaptic AMPA receptors gives it the ability to achieve a set action potential firing rate.

The probability of glutamate making contact with a post-synaptic AMPA receptor is proportional to the concentration of both trans-membrane glutamate and post-synaptic AMPA receptors. When glutamate and post-synaptic AMPA receptors interact, the post-synaptic cell experiences a temporary depolarizing current, known as an EPSP (excitatory postsynaptic potential). Spatial and temporal accumulation of EPSPs at the post-synaptic neuron increases the likelihood of the neuron firing an action potential. Therefore, the concentrations of extra-cellular glutamate (and other cations) and the quantity of post-synaptic AMPA receptors are directly correlated to a neurons' action potential firing rate. Some theories suggest each neuron uses calcium-dependent cellular sensors to detect their own action potential firing rate. These sensors also formulate input for cell-specific homeostatic plasticity regulation systems. In synaptic scaling, neurons use this information to determine a scale factor. Each neuron subsequently uses the scaling factor to globally scale (either up-regulate or down-regulate) the quantity of transmembrane AMPA receptors at all post-synaptic sites.

Some research indicates there are two mechanistically distinct forms of homeostatic plasticity involving trafficking or translation of AMPA receptors at post-synapse of synaptic connections:

1. Local synthesis of AMPA receptors: Local area AMPA receptor synthesis takes place within a time scale of 4 hours. mRNA translation frequency inside the post-synaptic neuron alters the quantity of local AMPA receptors produced. This mechanism is used to alter the quantity of post synaptic AMPA receptors over short time periods.
2. Global synaptic scaling: This form of homeostatic plasticity takes place over a time period of days (24–48 hours) and has a more pronounced effect on the overall firing rate of neurons than local AMPA receptor synthesis. Various intra-cellular transport mechanisms help AMPA receptors migrate to the post-synaptic cleft from the entire cell.

== Mechanisms ==
=== Local area AMPA receptor translation ===
The earliest phases of AMPA receptor quantity modulation (within a four-hour time period), are dependent on local area (near the synapse) AMPA receptor synthesis, where mRNAs translate for local AMPA receptor transcription. This mechanism is used to increase the number of post synaptic AMPA receptors over a short time period.

Ibata and colleagues studied local AMPA receptor scaling mechanisms by imaging post-synaptic trans-membrane GluR2 subunits using pharmaceutical manipulations over a time period of 4 hours. Fluorescent microscopy was used to visualize GluR2 proteins at synaptic sites of neurons. The study showed local area AMPA receptor translation takes place when post-synaptic firing and NMDA receptors are blocked simultaneously via pharmaceutical manipulations using APV and TTX to block post-synaptic firing. Dr. Turrigiano hypothesized blocking post-synaptic firing would induce up-regulation of AMPA receptors. Changes in existing GluR-2 protein fluorescence were seen in as little as an hour following a TTX bath. The quantity of synaptic sites stayed constant—indicating this short-term AMPA receptor synthesis takes place only on existing synaptic connections.

Intra-cellular electrophysiology recordings were conducted to verify whether increase in quantity of post-synaptic AMPA receptors equated to up-regulation of synaptic connection strength. Intracellular recordings show robust increase in mEPSC amplitude (approximately 130% above control values) following 4–5 hours of TTX treatment. Longer TTX treatments yielded a more noticeable increase in mEPSC amplitude. This form of AMPA receptor trafficking is hypothesized to be directed by local mRNA transcription.

=== Global ===
This form of synaptic scaling takes place over a time period of days and has a more pronounced effect on the overall firing rate of neurons than local AMPA receptor trafficking. Various intracellular transport mechanisms help AMPA receptors migrate from the entire neuron to the post-synaptic cleft.

A long-term, concurrent confocal microscopy and electrophysiology investigation conducted on cortical rat in-vitro neural networks (age > 3 weeks in-vitro) growing on Multi Electrode Arrays examined the correlation between network activity levels and changes in the sizes of individual synapses. Specifically, long-term fluorescent microscopy was used to track changes in the quantity (fluorescence) of PSD-95 molecules at individual synapses over timescales of several days. Since PSD-95 molecules anchor post-synaptic AMPA and NMDA receptors, they serve as reliable quantitative markers for post-synaptic transmembrane glutamate receptors. This investigation consisted of two sets of experiments. In the first set, synapse-morphology and spontaneous neural activity were monitored for about 90 hours (i.e. no external stimuli or pharmaceutical manipulations were used to perturb the neuronal networks). During this period, the sizes of individual synapses were observed to fluctuate considerably; yet distributions of synaptic sizes as well as average synaptic size values remained remarkably constant. It was found that ongoing activity acted to constrain synaptic sizes by increasing the tendency of large synapses to shrink and increasing the tendency of small synapses to grow. Thus, activity acted to maintain distributions of synaptic sizes (at the population level) within certain limits. In the second set of experiments the same analysis was performed after the addition of TTX to block all spontaneous activity. This led to a broadening of synaptic size distributions and to increases in average synaptic size values. When individual synapses were followed over time, their sizes were still found to fluctuate significantly, however now, no relationships were found between the extent or direction of size changes and initial synaptic size. In particular, no evidence was found that changes in synaptic size scaled with initial synaptic size. This indicated that the homeostatic growth in AMPA receptor content associated with the suppression of activity is a population phenomenon, that results from the loss of activity-dependent constraints, not from the scaling of AMPA receptor content at individual synapses.

== Relationship to homeostatic and Hebbian plasticity ==
There is evidence that presynaptic and postsynaptic homeostatic plasticity work in unison to regulate firing rate. Postsynaptic activity blockade (by TTX) in culture can increase mEPSC amplitude and mEPSC frequency. Increases in mEPSC frequency indicates the neurons experience an increase in probability of pre-synaptic glutamate neurotransmitter making contact with a post-synaptic AMPA receptor. Further, it's been shown that pre-synaptic vesicles change in size when action potential firing is blocked via (via TTX).

Presynaptic homeostatic plasticity involves: 1) Size and frequency of pre-synaptic neurotransmitter release (for example modulation of mEPSC). 2) Probability of neurotransmitter vesicle releasing after a firing of action potential. Post-synaptic activity blockade (by TTX) in culture can increase mEPSC amplitude and mEPSC frequency (freq. was only changed in cultures older than 18 days). Increase in mEPSC frequency indicates the neurons experience an increase in probability of pre-synaptic glutamate neurotransmitter making contact with a post-synaptic AMPA receptor.

Hebbian plasticity and homeostatic plasticity have a hand-in-glove relationship. Neurons use Hebbian plasticity mechanisms to modify their synaptic connections within the neural circuit based on the correlated input they receive from other neurons. Long-term potentiation (LTP) mechanisms are driven by related pre-synaptic and post-synaptic neuron firings; with the help of homeostatic plasticity, LTPs and LTDs create and maintain the precise synaptic weights in the neural network. Persisting correlated neural activity—without a homeostatic feedback loop—causes LTP mechanisms to continually up regulate synaptic connection strengths. Unspecified strengthening of synaptic weights causes neural activity to become unstable to the point that insignificant stimulatory perturbations can trigger chaotic, synchronous network-wide firing known as bursts. This renders the neural network incapable of computing. Since homeostatic plasticity normalizes the synaptic strengths of all neurons in a network, the overall neural network activity stabilizes.
