= Population spike =

Electrical effect associated with brain cell activity

In neuroscience, a population spike (PS) is the shift in electrical potential as a consequence of the movement of ions involved in the generation and propagation of action potentials. Population spikes often reflect synaptically induced firing and therefore, they can be classified as a type of field excitatory postsynaptic potentials.
In some areas of the brain, such as the hippocampus, neurons are arranged in such a way that they all receive synaptic inputs in the same area. Because these neurons are in the same orientation, the extracellular signals from the generation of action potentials don't cancel out, but rather add up to give a signal that can easily be recorded with a field electrode.
The PS is usually recorded with an extracellular electrode placed close to neural cell bodies or axons. The first interpretations of hippocampal field potentials were developed by Per Andersen.
