= Depolarizing prepulse =

Type of electrical stimulus in nerves

A depolarizing prepulse (DPP) is an electrical stimulus that causes the potential difference measured across a neuronal membrane to become more positive or less negative, and precedes another electrical stimulus. DPPs may be of either the voltage or current stimulus variety and have been used to inhibit neural activity, selectively excite neurons, and increase the pain threshold associated with electrocutaneous stimulation.

== Biophysical mechanisms ==
=== Hodgkin–Huxley model ===
An illustration of the standard Hodgkin–Huxley Na^{+} channel model

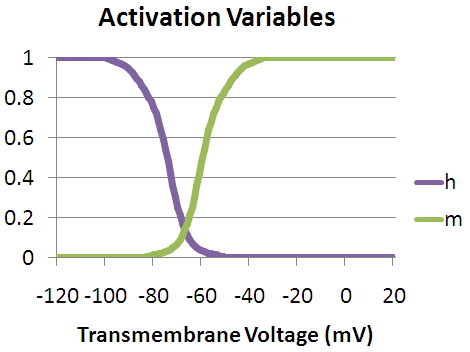
Summarized the original values reported by Hodgkin and Huxley

Typical action potentials are initiated by voltage-gated sodium channels. As the transmembrane voltage is increased the probability that a given voltage gated sodium channel is open is increased, thus enabling an influx of Na^{+} ions. Once the sodium inflow becomes greater than the potassium outflow, a positive feedback loop of sodium entry is closed and thus an action potential is fired.

In the early 1950s Drs. Hodgkin and Huxley performed experiments on the squid giant axon, and in the process developed a model (the Hodgkin–Huxley model) for sodium channel conductance. It was found that the conductance may be expressed as:

$${g}_{Na^+} = \bar{g}_{Na^+} m^3h,$$

where $\bar{g}_{Na^+}$ is the maximum sodium conductance, m is the activation gate, and h is the inactivation gate (both gates are shown in the adjacent image). The values of m and h vary between 0 and 1, depending upon the transmembrane potential.

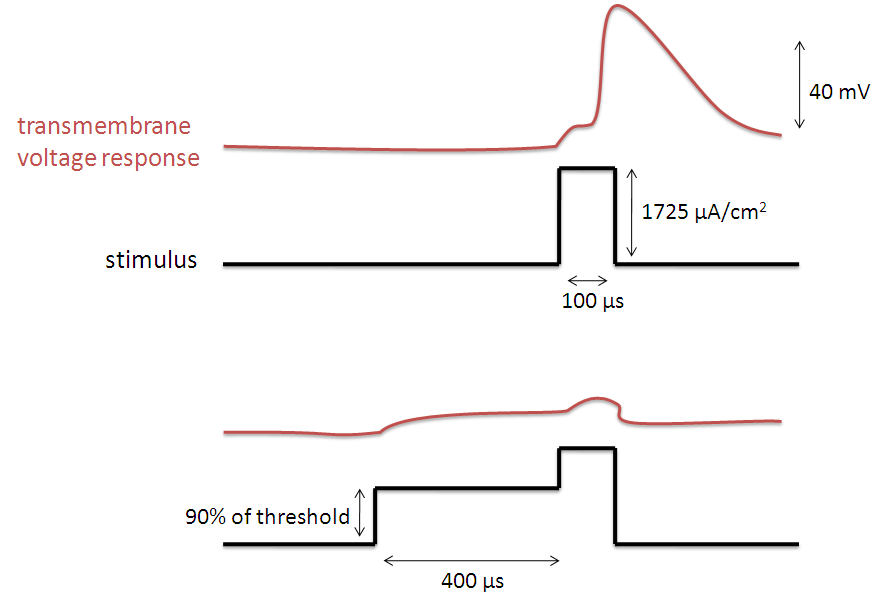
Transmembrane voltage response of a space-clamped mammalian node of Ranvier

As the transmembrane potential rises, the value of m increases, thus increasing the probability that the activation gate will be open. And as the transmembrane potential drops, the value of h increases, along with the probability that the inactivation gate will be open. The rate of change for an h gate is much slower than that of an m gate, therefore if one precedes a sub-threshold voltage stimulation with a hyperpolarizing prepulse, the value of h may be temporarily increased, enabling the neuron to fire an action potential.

Vice versa, if one precedes a supra-threshold voltage stimulation with a depolarizing prepulse, the value of h may be temporarily reduced, enabling the inhibition of the neuron. An illustration of how the transmembrane voltage response to a supra-threshold stimulus may differ, based upon the presence of a depolarizing prepulse, may be observed in the adjacent image.

The Hodgkin–Huxley model is slightly inaccurate as it fudges over some dependencies, for example the inactivation gate should not be able to close unless the activation gate is open and the inactivation gate, once closed, is located inside the cell membrane where it cannot be directly affected by the transmembrane potential. However, this model is useful for gaining a high level understanding of hyperpolarizing and depolarizing prepulses. Depolarizing neurons creates a more likely out come of the neuron firing.

=== Voltage-gated sodium channel ===
Diagram of a voltage-sensitive sodium channel α-subunit. G - glycosylation, P - phosphorylation, S - ion selectivity, I - inactivation, positive (+) charges in S4 are important for transmembrane voltage sensing.

Since the Hodgkin–Huxley model was first proposed in the 1950s, much has been learned concerning the structure and functionality of voltage-gated sodium channels. Although the exact three dimensional structure of the sodium channel remains unknown, its composition and the functionality of individual components have been determined. Voltage-gated sodium channels are large, multimeric complexes, composed of a single α subunit and one or more β subunits, an illustration of which may be observed in the adjacent image. The α subunit folds into four homologous domains, each of which contain six α-helical transmembrane segments. The S_{4} segments of each domain serve as voltage sensors for activation. Each S_{4} segment consists of a repeating structure of one positively charged residue and two hydrophobic residues, and these combine to form a helical arrangement. When the channel is depolarized these S_{4} segments undergo a conformational change that widens the helical arrangement and opens the sodium-channel pore. Within milliseconds after the pore's opening, the intracellular loop that connects domains III and IV, binds to the channel's intracellular pore, inactivating the channel. Thus, by providing a depolarizing prepulse before a stimulus, there is a greater probability that the inactivating domains of the sodium channels have bound to their respective pores, reducing the stimulus induced sodium influx and the influence of the stimulus.

== Depolarizing prepulse properties ==
=== DPP duration ===
The relationship between the DPP duration and neuronal recruitment is as follows. If the duration of the DPP is relatively short, i.e. much less than 100 μs, then the threshold of excitation for the surrounding nerves will be decreased as opposed to increased. Possibly resulting from the depolarization of the S_{4} segments and the little time given for inactivation. For long duration DPP's the III and IV domains of the sodium channels (discussed above) are given more time to bind with their respective channel pores, thus the threshold current is observed to increase with an increasing DPP duration.

=== DPP amplitude ===
As the DPP amplitude is increased from zero to near threshold, the resulting increase in threshold current will grow as well. This is because the higher amplitude activates more sodium channels, thus allowing more channels to become inactivated by their III and IV domains.

=== DPP inter-phase delay ===
An increase in the delay between the DPP and the stimulus provides more time during which the sodium channel S_{4} segments may close and the III and IV domains may detach themselves from their respective pores. Thus, an increase in the DPP inter-phase delay will reduce the effective increase in threshold current, induced by the DPP.

== Depolarizing prepulse applications ==
=== Elevating pain thresholds ===
One immediate application for depolarizing prepulses, explored by Drs. Poletto and Van Doren, is to elevate the pain thresholds associated with electrocutaneous stimulation. Electrocutaneous stimulation possesses a great deal of potential as a mechanism for the conveyance of additional sensory information. Hence, this method of stimulation may be directly applied to fields such as virtual reality, sensory substitution, and sensory augmentation . However, many of these applications require the use of small electrode arrays, stimulation through which is often painful, thus limiting the usefulness of this technology. The experimental setup, constructed by Drs. Poletto and Van Doren, was as follows:

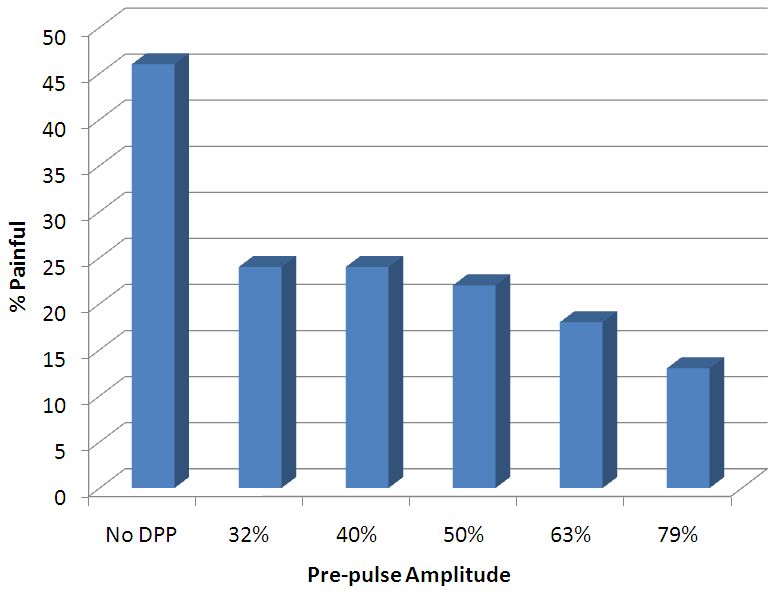
Mean proportions of stimuli perceived as painful v. stimulus prepulse

- 4 human subjects, each of which had demonstrated the ability to provide reliable pain judgments in previous studies
- left middle finger rests on a 1 mm diameter polished stainless steel disk electrodes
- a single stimulus consisted of a burst of three identical prepulse and stim-pulse pairs, presented at the beginning, middle, and end of a 1-second interval
- the prepulse and stim-pulse widths were matched at a duration of 10 milliseconds so that the thresholds would be the same for both
- used varying prepulse amplitudes of 0%, 79%, 63%, 50%, 40%, and 32% so as to study their influence over the pain experienced
- the experiments were conducted in such a way that the stimulus, without a prepulse was painful for about half of the time; this was achieved by stepping the stim-pulse amplitude up and down for the next trial, based upon whether it was reported as painful

Their results demonstrated that a prepulse before a stimulus pulse effectively reduces the probability that pain will be experienced due to electrocutaneous stimulation. Surprisingly enough, a prepulse of 32% of the amplitude of the stimulus pulse was able to nearly half the probability of experiencing pain. Therefore, in environments in which the pain threshold is difficult to discern, it may be sufficient to deliver a relatively low amplitude prepulse before the stimulus to achieve the desired effects.

=== Nerve fiber recruitment order ===
Based upon the data presented in

In addition to inhibiting neural excitability, it has been observed that preceding an electrical stimulus with a depolarizing prepulse allows one to invert the current-distance relationship controlling nerve fiber recruitment, where the current-distance relationship describes how the threshold current for nerve fiber excitation is proportional to the square of the distance between the nerve fiber and the electrode. Therefore, if the region of influence for the depolarizing prepulse is less than that for the stimulus, the nerve fibers closer to the electrode will experience a greater increase in their threshold current for excitation. Thus, provided such a stimulus, the nerve fibers closest to the electrode may be inhibited, while those further away may be excited. A simulation of this stimulation, constructed by Drs. Warren Grill and J. Thomas Mortimer, may be observed in the adjacent image. Building upon this, a stimulus with two depolarizing prepulses, each of an amplitude slightly below the threshold current (at the time of delivery), should increase the radii of influence for nearby nerve fiber inactivation and distant nerve fiber excitation.

Typically, nerve fibers of a larger diameter may be activated by single-pulse stimuli of a lower intensity, and thus may be recruited more readily. However, DPPs have demonstrated the additional capability to invert this recruitment order. As electrical stimuli have a greater effect over nerve fibers of a larger diameter, DPPs will in turn cause a larger degree of sodium conductance inactivation within such nerve fibers, thus nerve fibers of a smaller diameter will have a lower threshold current.

== See also ==
- Prepulse inhibition
