= Spike-timing-dependent plasticity =

Biological process that adjusts the strength of connections between neurons in the brain

Spike-timing-dependent plasticity (STDP) is a biological process that adjusts the strength of synaptic connections between neurons based on the relative timing of their action potentials (or spikes). It is a temporally sensitive form of synaptic plasticity, meaning that the efficiency of synaptic transmission is modified by the timing of neural activity. When a presynaptic neuron consistently fires just before a postsynaptic neuron, the connection is typically strengthened—a process known as long-term potentiation (LTP). If the timing is reversed and the presynaptic neuron fires after the postsynaptic neuron, the connection is weakened through long-term depression (LTD).

STDP is considered a key mechanism in learning and memory formation and helps explain activity-dependent development of neural circuits. It has been observed in multiple brain regions, including the hippocampus, neocortex, and visual system, and has been widely implemented in computational models of biologically inspired learning algorithms and network dynamics.

STDP develops early in life, helping to refine sensory maps and establish functional connectivity during critical periods. The process depends on molecular mechanisms such as NMDA receptor-mediated calcium signaling and is influenced by synapse location and neuromodulators like dopamine and acetylcholine.

Variants of STDP have been found at inhibitory synapses and in response to complex spike patterns. The process also interacts with other forms of plasticity, including rate-based learning, homeostatic regulation, and structural remodeling. Disruptions in STDP have been linked to neurological and psychiatric conditions such as Alzheimer's disease, Fragile X syndrome, epilepsy, and Parkinson's disease.

== Mechanism ==
Spike-timing-dependent plasticity (STDP) depends on the precise timing of action potentials (spikes) between presynaptic and postsynaptic neurons, hence the name: "spike-timing-dependent plasticity". If a presynaptic spike occurs shortly before a postsynaptic spike—typically within a window of 10 to 20 milliseconds—the synapse is strengthened, a process known as long-term potentiation (LTP). If the presynaptic spike follows the postsynaptic spike, the synapse is weakened, resulting in long-term depression (LTD). This timing-dependent adjustment of synaptic strength enables neurons to reinforce inputs that are likely to have contributed to their activation while weakening those that were not causally involved.

The effect of STDP is cumulative: repeated pairings of causally timed spikes strengthen the relevant synapses, while others weaken over time. Eventually, this leads to a subset of inputs being selectively retained, particularly those that tend to fire together within narrow temporal windows. As a result, the neuron becomes tuned to detect and respond preferentially to input patterns that consistently precede its own activation, which may reflect meaningful or predictive features of the environment.

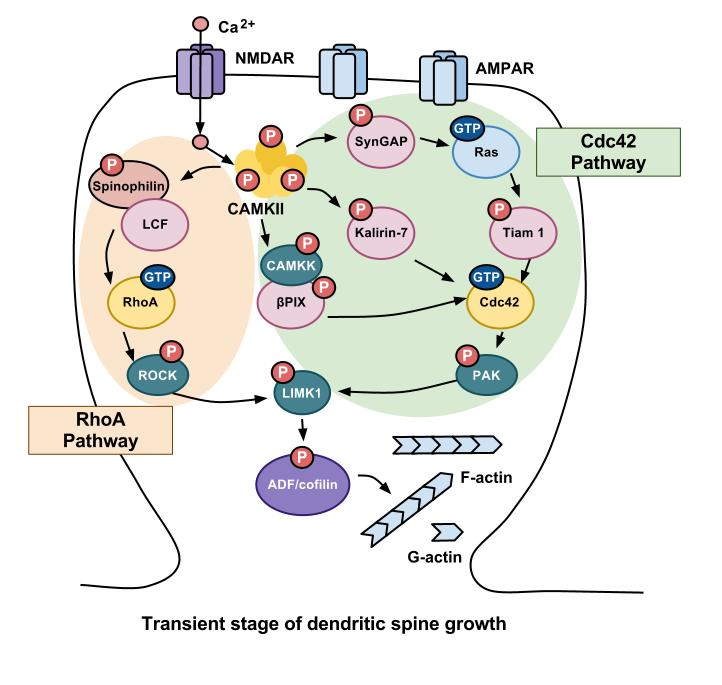
Calcium influx through NMDA receptors activates CaMKII, which initiates signaling cascades involving Rho family GTPases, primarily RhoA and Cdc42. These pathways regulate actin-binding proteins such as cofilin and profilin. During the transient phase, LIMK1 phosphorylates ADF/cofilin, inhibiting actin depolymerization, expanding dendritic spine volume, and contributing to the induction of LTP.

At the molecular level, STDP is primarily mediated by N-methyl-D-aspartate receptors (NMDA receptors) located on the postsynaptic membrane. These receptors function as coincidence detectors: they require both the release of glutamate from the presynaptic terminal and sufficient depolarization of the postsynaptic membrane to become fully activated. When these conditions are met—such as when a back-propagating action potential follows synaptic input—the NMDA receptor channel opens, allowing calcium ions to enter the postsynaptic cell.

The amplitude and duration of calcium influx determine the direction of synaptic change. High-amplitude, rapid calcium transients typically trigger LTP via the activation of calcium-sensitive kinases, while lower, prolonged calcium levels are associated with LTD, in part due to the activation of phosphatases. The spike-timing rule is therefore shaped by intracellular signaling cascades that translate calcium signals into long-term structural or biochemical changes at the synapse.

Although the mechanisms of LTP are relatively well understood, the pathways underlying spike-timing-dependent LTD can vary. LTD may involve voltage-dependent calcium entry through other channels, activation of metabotropic glutamate receptors, or the release of retrograde messengers such as endocannabinoids. In some synapses, presynaptic NMDA receptors also contribute to LTD by modulating neurotransmitter release.

The specific shape of the STDP learning window—the curve that relates spike timing difference to synaptic change—differs across brain regions and cell types. Many synapses exhibit an asymmetric window favoring LTP for pre-before-post timing and LTD for post-before-pre. However, other synapses display symmetric, anti-Hebbian, or frequency-dependent patterns, particularly under different neuromodulatory conditions or in inhibitory circuits.

== STDP in Inhibitory Synapses ==
Most early STDP research focused on excitatory (glutamatergic) synapses, but timing-dependent plasticity also occurs at inhibitory synapses. However, the rules of STDP at GABAergic synapses can differ significantly from their excitatory counterparts. In many cases, inhibitory STDP is anti-Hebbian or weight-dependent in the opposite manner. For example, in cortical circuits, fast-spiking parvalbumin-positive interneurons that synapse onto pyramidal cells exhibit timing-dependent changes in synaptic strength. When the interneuron fires slightly before the postsynaptic pyramidal neuron, providing feed-forward inhibition, the inhibitory synapse is weakened, a process known as inhibitory long-term depression. In contrast, if the interneuron fires after, or with a longer delay relative to the pyramidal neuron, the synapse is strengthened, resulting in inhibitory long-term potentiation.

This was first demonstrated in the rodent neocortex with paired recordings: near-synchronous firing produced inhibitory long-term potentiation, but if the inhibitory neuron consistently led the excitatory cell by a few milliseconds, the connection underwent lasting depression. Such timing rules for inhibitory STDP are essentially the mirror-image of classic excitatory STDP and serve to modulate circuit excitability. Strengthening an inhibitory synapse when it fires after the excitatory neuron can be interpreted as enhancing feedback inhibition, whereas weakening it when it fires before the excitatory neuron reduces feed-forward inhibition, potentially allowing the excitatory neuron to fire more easily in the future.

The physiological roles of inhibitory STDP are still being elucidated. One important function appears to be the fine-tuning of excitatory–inhibitory balance in neural networks. Timing-dependent changes at inhibitory synapses have been shown to contribute to sensory map plasticity. In the auditory cortex, for instance, plasticity of inhibitory synapses following specific spike-timing protocols has been linked to the remapping of neuronal frequency preference, implying that inhibitory STDP participates in experience-dependent reorganization of receptive fields.

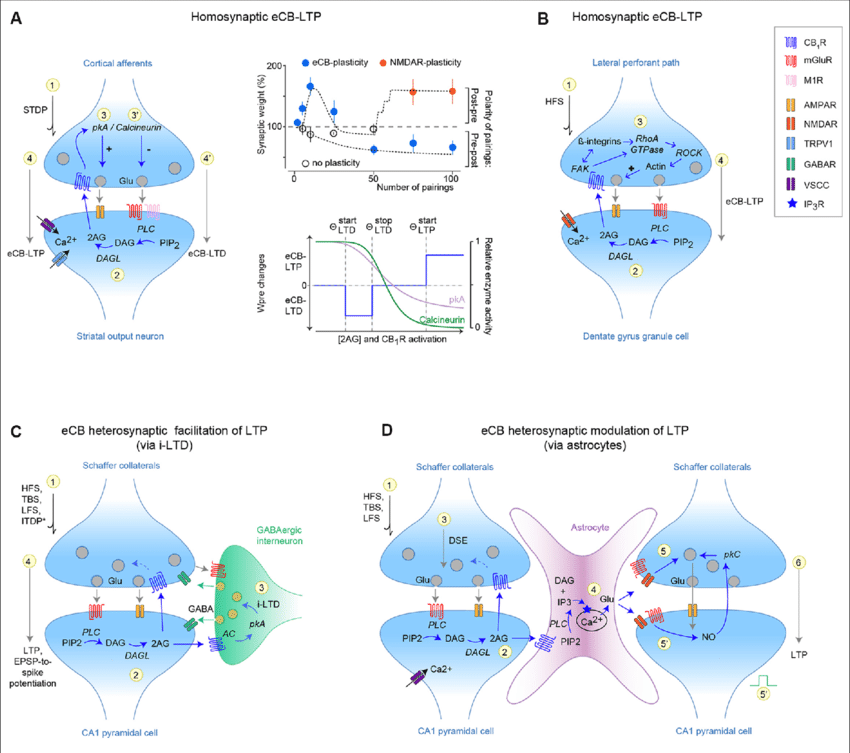
Endocannabinoids released from the postsynaptic neuron modulate synaptic strength. In homosynaptic plasticity, these effects are confined to the active synapse, whereas in heterosynaptic plasticity, the signaling can influence neighboring, inactive synapses. (See section "Interaction with Other Forms of Plasticity" for more detail)

Moreover, distinct molecular mechanisms underlie STDP at inhibitory synapses. Unlike excitatory LTP/LTD (often NMDA receptor-dependent), inhibitory long-term plasticity can require retrograde signaling and neuromodulators. In hippocampal CA1 pyramidal cells, an STDP protocol that induces long-term depression of GABAergic synapses was found to depend on endocannabinoid release and the activation of presynaptic M2 muscarinic acetylcholine receptors. In this case, precisely timed postsynaptic spikes trigger the synthesis of endocannabinoids which act on CB1 receptors at the interneuron terminals, reducing GABA release, a mechanism quite different from NMDA-dependent excitatory STDP. Such requirements highlight that inhibitory STDP often engages metaplastic gating factors (e.g., cholinergic tone or cannabinoid signaling) to occur.

Overall, STDP in inhibitory synapses adds an important plasticity paradigm: it enables activity-dependent adjustment of inhibition in neural circuits, complementing excitatory plasticity and ensuring that the timing of inhibition relative to excitation can be optimized through experience.

== Neuromodulation of STDP ==
Neuromodulators strongly influence STDP by modifying the timing rules that determine whether a synapse is strengthened or weakened. These changes depend on broader brain states, such as arousal, attention, or reward, allowing synaptic plasticity to be tuned to the behavioral context. Experimental studies have shown that the presence of neuromodulatory signals (such as dopamine, acetylcholine, noradrenaline, serotonin, etc.) can gate or alter the outcome of STDP. For example, in hippocampal and cortical slices, activation of β-adrenergic receptors can convert what would normally be an LTD-induced timing into a net LTP. One study demonstrated that applying isoproterenol (a β-adrenergic agonist) during an STDP induction protocol abolished the LTD that would occur when postsynaptic spikes followed presynaptic spikes (post–pre pairing), and instead resulted in potentiation for all spike-timing intervals tested. In essence, adrenergic neuromodulation extended the potentiation window and prevented LTD, overriding the usual temporal requirements. This finding aligns with a broader principle: neuromodulators that activate cAMP/PKA pathways (like norepinephrine via β receptors or dopamine via D1 receptors) tend to bias synaptic plasticity toward potentiation, whereas other signals can bias toward depression.

Acetylcholine and dopamine provide an example of sequential neuromodulation of STDP. Acetylcholine (acting largely through muscarinic receptors in the forebrain) can bias STDP toward depression, for instance, by lowering the threshold for LTD induction or narrowing the LTP window. This might occur during exploratory or attentive states when acetylcholine is high. If a reward or salient outcome then follows, dopamine is released and can invert the synaptic changes from depression to potentiation. In hippocampal experiments, an initial conditioning in the presence of acetylcholine resulted in synaptic weakening, but a subsequent application of dopamine converted that LTD into LTP. Moreover, dopamine can broaden the STDP time window for potentiation and can even rescue LTP if given shortly after the spike pairing, effectively imparting a reward timing signal to STDP. This modulatory sequence (ACh followed by dopamine) has been proposed as a cellular mechanism for associating sensory cues or actions with delayed reward, by first allowing synapses to depress and then reinforcing them if the outcome is positive.

In general, neuromodulators enable state-dependent plasticity: the brain can promote or prevent STDP under certain conditions. For instance, in the presence of cholinergic tone (e.g., during waking exploration), some cortical synapses may not potentiate with STDP unless dopaminergic or noradrenergic signals also indicate a behaviorally important event. Neuromodulation of STDP is not limited to the classic neurotransmitters; it potentially extends to neuropeptides, stress hormones, and other modulators that adjust neural plasticity. This dynamic regulation ensures that STDP in real neural circuits is context-sensitive. Synaptic changes occur not only based on spike timing but also in conjunction with the animal's arousal, attention, and reward environment, thereby linking synaptic plasticity to learning and motivation processes.

== History ==
The conceptual foundation for spike-timing-dependent plasticity (STDP) is rooted in the mid-20th century work of Canadian psychologist Donald Hebb. In his 1949 book, The Organization of Behavior, Hebb proposed that the repeated and persistent activation of a presynaptic neuron contributes to the firing of a postsynaptic neuron. This interaction strengthens the connection between them. This principle, now known as Hebbian theory, is often summarized as "cells that fire together, wire together". While Hebb's framework emphasized the co-occurrence of neural activity, it did not account for the precise temporal order of neuronal firing.

In 1973 M. M. Taylor proposed a theoretical learning rule in which synapses would be strengthened if a presynaptic spike reliably preceded a postsynaptic spike, and weakened if the timing was reversed. He suggested that such a temporally sensitive mechanism could support more efficient encoding of input patterns, although this idea did not receive widespread attention at the time.

Experimental studies in the 1980s and early 1990s began to probe the timing dependence of synaptic plasticity more directly. Notably, W. B. Levy and O. Steward (1983) demonstrated that the timing between pre- and postsynaptic activity could influence the direction of synaptic change. Subsequent work by Y. Dan and Mu-Ming Poo (1992) at neuromuscular synapses, and by D. Debanne, B. Gähwiler, and S. Thompson (1994) in the hippocampus, showed that asynchronous pairing of spikes could lead to long-term synaptic depression (LTD).

The modern concept of STDP began to take clearer shape through work in the mid-1990s. Henry Markram, working in Bert Sakmann's lab, used dual patch-clamp recordings to show that the order of spike firing between two connected neurons could bidirectionally modify synaptic strength. When the presynaptic neuron was activated approximately 10 milliseconds before the postsynaptic neuron, the connection was strengthened; reversing the order led to weakening. Although these findings were presented in abstracts and conference proceedings earlier, they were formally published in 1997.

In 1998 Guoqiang Bi and Mu-Ming Poo systematically mapped the time-dependent curve relating the order of pre- and postsynaptic spikes to the magnitude and direction of synaptic change in cultured hippocampal neurons. Their work demonstrated that small differences in spike timing—on the order of tens of milliseconds—could induce either long-term potentiation (LTP) or long-term depression (LTD). This study became a foundational reference for what is now recognized as the canonical STDP "learning window."

Since these early findings, STDP has been confirmed in a wide range of preparations, including brain slices and in vivo systems, across different species and brain regions. STDP-like mechanisms have been observed in the visual cortex, hippocampus, cerebellum, and neocortex, as well as in sensory-evoked responses in intact animals. It has also been demonstrated that the initially asymmetric timing window seen in early STDP studies can evolve over time; for example, one study showed that a more symmetric "LTP-only" profile may emerge several days after initial induction.

STDP is now widely regarded as a key biological mechanism supporting Hebbian learning, particularly during development, where it is thought to refine neural circuits based on experience.

== From Hebbian rule to STDP ==
According to Hebb's original postulate, synaptic strength increases when the presynaptic neuron persistently contributes to the firing of the postsynaptic neuron. Conversely, synapses weaken when the activity of the presynaptic neuron is consistently unrelated to postsynaptic firing. These principles are often simplified by the mnemonics: "cells that fire together, wire together," and "out of sync, lose their link".

However, Hebb's formulation did not explicitly address the directionality of firing. Two neurons firing at exactly the same time cannot satisfy a causal relationship. To contribute to the firing of a postsynaptic neuron, the presynaptic neuron must fire shortly before it. Experimental studies confirmed that this precise temporal relationship is critical for synaptic modification: when the presynaptic spike occurs just before the postsynaptic one, the synapse is potentiated; if it follows, the synapse is depressed.

Furthermore, STDP appears to depend not only on the timing between individual spikes, but also on the consistency with which presynaptic firing predicts postsynaptic activation. This mirrors the principle of contingency (learning theory), well known in classical conditioning: consistent predictive relationships, rather than mere co-occurrence, are necessary for robust learning.

== Role in hippocampal learning ==
Spike-timing-dependent plasticity (STDP) operates over a narrow time window—typically on the order of tens of milliseconds—yet the hippocampus is capable of associating events that unfold over several seconds, as is required during episodic memory formation. This apparent mismatch in time scales is reconciled, in part, by the presence of theta waves (4–8 Hz), rhythmic electrical activity in the hippocampus that organizes neuronal firing during active exploration and learning.

As an animal experiences a sequence of events or traverses space, hippocampal place cells fire at progressively earlier phases of each theta cycle, a phenomenon known as phase precession. This effectively compresses temporally distributed spikes into a narrower window—aligning them within a single theta cycle (~100–150 ms)—allowing spikes from sequentially active neurons to fall within the STDP window.

In the recurrent networks of the CA3 region, this phase alignment enables the strengthening of synaptic connections between neurons representing adjacent elements of an experience. STDP can thus support the formation of ordered memory traces by selectively reinforcing connections where presynaptic activity consistently predicts postsynaptic firing. This mechanism provides a biological basis for linking discrete experiences into coherent episodes and may underlie the hippocampus's role in encoding the temporal structure of memory.

== Computational models and applications ==
=== Training spiking neural networks ===
The principles of STDP can be utilized in the training of artificial spiking neural networks. Using this approach the weight of a connection between two neurons is increased if the time at which a presynaptic spike ($t_{pre}$) occurs is shortly before the time of a post synaptic spike($t_{post}$), ie. $t = t_{post}-t_{pre}$ and $t > 0$. The size of the weight increase is dependent on the value of $t$ and decreases exponentially as the value of $t$ increases given by the equation:

$A_+ \exp{\left(\frac{-t}{\tau_+}\right)}$

where $A_+$ is the maximum possible change and $\tau_+$ is the time constant.

If the opposite scenario occurs ie a post synaptic spike occurs before a presynaptic spike then the weight is instead reduced according to the equation:

$A_- \exp{\left(\frac{t}{\tau_ -}\right)}$

Where $A_-$and $\tau_-$ serve the same function of defining the maximum possible change and time constant as before respectively.

The parameters that define the decay profile ($A_+$,$A_-$, etc.) do not necessarily have to be fixed across the entire network and different synapses may have different shapes associated with them.

Biological evidence suggests that this pairwise STDP approach cannot give a complete description of a biological neuron and more advanced approaches which look at symmetric triplets of spikes (pre-post-pre, post-pre-post) have been developed and these are believed to be more biologically plausible.

== Developmental and Critical Period Plasticity ==
STDP is thought to play significant roles in neural development, particularly during critical periods when activity-dependent refinement of connections is highly pronounced. In early postnatal development, synaptic plasticity mechanisms are transiently enhanced to allow experience to shape neural circuits such as sensory maps. STDP provides an elegant rule for such refinement, and evidence suggests that STDP properties change over development to support different phases of circuit maturation. In the rodent barrel cortex (whisker somatosensory map), for example, synapses initially exhibit a unimodal timing rule, essentially all correlated activity results in potentiation in the first two postnatal weeks. During this stage, any pairing of pre- and postsynaptic spikes tends to strengthen the connection, consistent with a developmental period of synapse stabilization. Then, around the onset of the critical period (approximately 15 days postnatal), classical bidirectional Hebbian STDP emerges at these synapses. The appearance of Hebbian, bidirectional STDP coincides with the maturation of local inhibitory circuits, particularly parvalbumin-positive interneurons, which sharpen the timing of postsynaptic spikes and restrict the time window for plasticity.

This developmental switch from "all-to-potentiation" to "timing-sensitive" plasticity marks a transition from a phase of general connectivity strengthening to one of competitive refinement. It is essential for the onset of the critical period in barrel cortex, as the newly emerged STDP rule allows for the fine-scale weakening of less-active inputs and strengthening of well-timed inputs, sculpting the receptive fields of layer 2/3 neurons to better discriminate whisker-specific inputs.

More broadly, STDP is implicated in critical period plasticity across multiple brain regions. During critical periods in visual cortex, for instance, the timing of pre- and postsynaptic activity (driven by visual experience) likely contributes to synaptic competition underlying ocular dominance plasticity and orientation selectivity. The flexibility of STDP appears to be greater in juvenile brains, studies have found that younger animals can exhibit larger timing-dependent changes, whereas in mature circuits the same STDP protocols might produce smaller effects unless neuromodulatory conditions re-enable plasticity. One contributing factor is the prevalence of NR2B-containing NMDA receptors in early development, which extend the duration of synaptic currents and broaden the timing window for STDP induction. Other developmental changes, such as the strengthening of perisomatic inhibition and the formation of extracellular matrix structures (e.g., perineuronal nets), serve to tighten STDP time windows and limit plasticity, contributing to critical period closure.

Experimental manipulations confirm these roles: increasing inhibition prematurely can close a critical period and suppress STDP, while reducing inhibition or delaying circuit maturation can prolong a plastic, STDP-permissive state. STDP's contribution to developmental plasticity is also supported by theoretical models, which demonstrate that timing-based rules are sufficient to refine topographic maps and receptive fields in early sensory systems. In summary, STDP works in concert with developmental regulatory processes to ensure that early in life, synaptic connections are broadly strengthened by correlated activity, and later, as inhibition matures, STDP becomes more selective, enabling critical period experiences to fine-tune synapses and solidify mature circuit properties.

== See also ==
- Synaptic plasticity
- Didactic organisation
