= Excitatory postsynaptic potential =

Electrical signal encouraging a neuron to fire

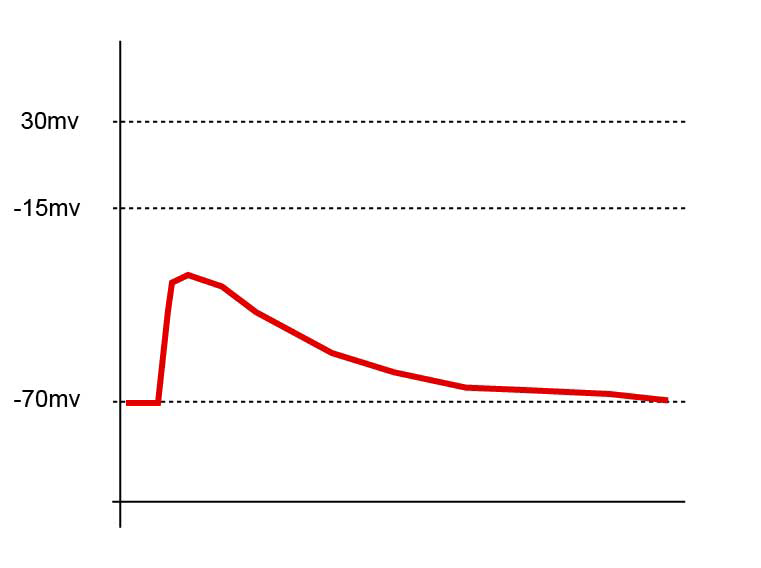
This single EPSP does not sufficiently depolarize the membrane to generate an action potential.

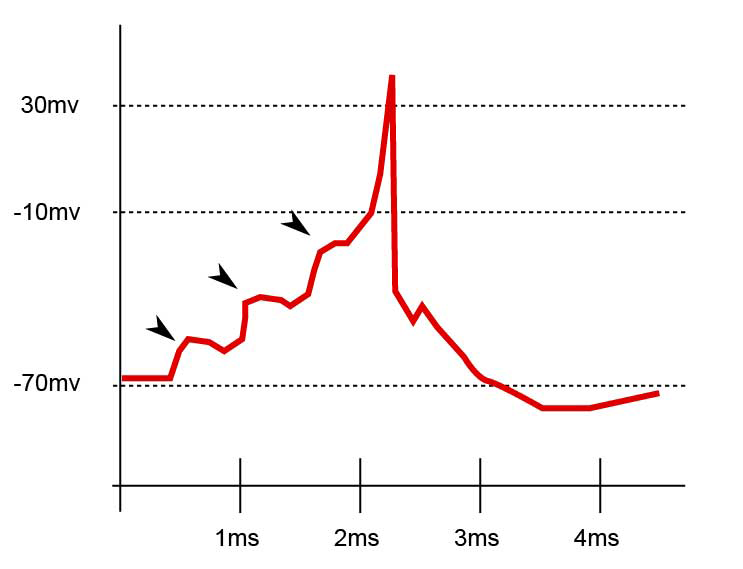
The summation of these three EPSPs generates an action potential.

In neuroscience, an excitatory postsynaptic potential (EPSP) is a postsynaptic potential that makes the postsynaptic neuron more likely to fire an action potential. This temporary depolarization of postsynaptic membrane potential, caused by the flow of positively charged ions into the postsynaptic cell, is a result of opening ligand-gated ion channels. These are the opposite of inhibitory postsynaptic potentials (IPSPs), which usually result from the flow of negative ions into the cell or positive ions out of the cell. EPSPs can also result from a decrease in outgoing positive charges, while IPSPs are sometimes caused by an increase in positive charge outflow. The flow of ions that causes an EPSP is an excitatory postsynaptic current (EPSC).

EPSPs, like IPSPs, are graded (i.e. they have an additive effect). When multiple EPSPs occur on a single patch of postsynaptic membrane, their combined effect is the sum of the individual EPSPs. Larger EPSPs result in greater membrane depolarization and thus increase the likelihood that the postsynaptic cell reaches the threshold for firing an action potential.

EPSPs in living cells are caused chemically. When an active presynaptic cell releases neurotransmitters into the synapse, some of them bind to receptors on the postsynaptic cell. Many of these receptors contain an ion channel capable of passing positively charged ions either into or out of the cell (such receptors are called ionotropic receptors). At excitatory synapses, the ion channel typically allows sodium into the cell, generating an excitatory postsynaptic current. This depolarizing current causes an increase in membrane potential, the EPSP.

== Excitatory molecules ==
The neurotransmitter most often associated with EPSPs is the amino acid glutamate, and is the main excitatory neurotransmitter in the central nervous system of vertebrates. Its ubiquity at excitatory synapses has led to it being called the excitatory neurotransmitter. In some invertebrates, glutamate is the main excitatory transmitter at the neuromuscular junction. In the neuromuscular junction of vertebrates, EPP (end-plate potentials) are mediated by the neurotransmitter acetylcholine, which (along with glutamate) is one of the primary transmitters in the central nervous system of invertebrates. At the same time, GABA is the most common neurotransmitter associated with IPSPs in the brain. However, classifying neurotransmitters as such is technically incorrect, as there are several other synaptic factors that help determine a neurotransmitter's excitatory or inhibitory effects.

== Miniature EPSPs and quantal analysis ==
The release of neurotransmitter vesicles from the presynaptic cell is probabilistic. In fact, even without stimulation of the presynaptic cell, a single vesicle will occasionally be released into the synapse, generating miniature EPSPs (mEPSPs). Bernard Katz pioneered the study of these mEPSPs at the neuromuscular junction (often called miniature end-plate potentials) in 1951, revealing the quantal nature of synaptic transmission. Quantal size can then be defined as the synaptic response to the release of neurotransmitter from a single vesicle, while quantal content is the number of effective vesicles released in response to a nerve impulse. Quantal analysis refers to the methods used to deduce, for a particular synapse, how many quanta of transmitter are released and what the average effect of each quantum is on the target cell, measured in terms of amount of ions flowing (charge) or change in the membrane potential.

== Field EPSPs ==
EPSPs are usually recorded using intracellular electrodes. The extracellular signal from a single neuron is extremely small and thus next to impossible to record in the human brain. However, in some areas of the brain, such as the hippocampus, neurons are arranged in such a way that they all receive synaptic inputs in the same area. Because these neurons are in the same orientation, the extracellular signals from synaptic excitation don't cancel out, but rather add up to give a signal that can easily be recorded with a field electrode. This extracellular signal recorded from a population of neurons is the field potential. In studies of hippocampal long-term potentiation (LTP), figures are often given showing the field EPSP (fEPSP) in stratum radiatum of CA1 in response to Schaffer collateral stimulation. This is the signal seen by an extracellular electrode placed in the layer of apical dendrites of CA1 pyramidal neurons. The Schaffer collaterals make excitatory synapses onto these dendrites, and so when they are activated, there is a current sink in stratum radiatum: the field EPSP. The voltage deflection recorded during a field EPSP is negative-going, while an intracellularly recorded EPSP is positive-going. This difference is due to the relative flow of ions (primarily the sodium ion) into the cell, which, in the case of the field EPSP is away from the electrode, while for an intracellular EPSPs it is towards the electrode. After a field EPSP, the extracellular electrode may record another change in electrical potential named the population spike which corresponds to the population of cells firing action potentials (spiking). In other regions than CA1 of the hippocampus, the field EPSP may be far more complex and harder to interpret as the source and sinks are far less defined. In regions such as the striatum, neurotransmitters such as dopamine, acetylcholine, GABA and others may also be released and further complicate the interpretation.

== See also ==
- Glycine
- Nonspiking neurons
- Summation (neurophysiology)
