= Shunting =

Shunting may refer to:

- Ribosome shunting, a mechanism in protein biosynthesis
- Shunting (rail), a rail transport operation
- Shunting (neurophysiology), a concept in neurophysiology
- Shunting (sailing), a maneuver for sailing upwind

== See also ==
- Shunt (disambiguation)
