= Hafenreffer =

Hafenreffer is a German surname. Notable people with the surname include:

- Matthias Hafenreffer (1561–1619), German Lutheran theologian
- Samuel Hafenreffer (1587–1660), German physician
