= Antipruritic =

Medications that inhibit itching

Antipruritics, abirritants, or anti-itch drugs, are medications that inhibit itching (Latin: pruritus). Itching is often associated with sunburns, allergic reactions, eczema, psoriasis, chickenpox, fungal infections, insect bites and stings like those from mosquitoes, fleas, mites, and contact dermatitis and urticaria caused by plants such as poison ivy (urushiol-induced contact dermatitis) or stinging nettle. Itching can also be caused by chronic kidney disease and related conditions.

Abirritants consist of a large group of drugs belonging to different classes with varying mechanisms to treat itch. They may work either directly or indirectly to relieve itch, and evidence on their effectiveness varies from one class to another. Some alternative medicines are also used to treat itch. Side effects of abirritants also vary depending on the class of the drug. Even before the emergence of modern evidence-based medicine, abirritants had already been used in many civilizations, but practices and choice of drugs differ by culture.

== Types ==
A number of drug classes are available as abirritants for itching relief, but there is no one single specific abirritant to treat all forms of itch. Treatments may vary depending on the cause. Commonly prescribed abirritants can be broadly divided into topical and systemic drugs, and may include a combination of one or more drugs, described as below.

=== Topical ===
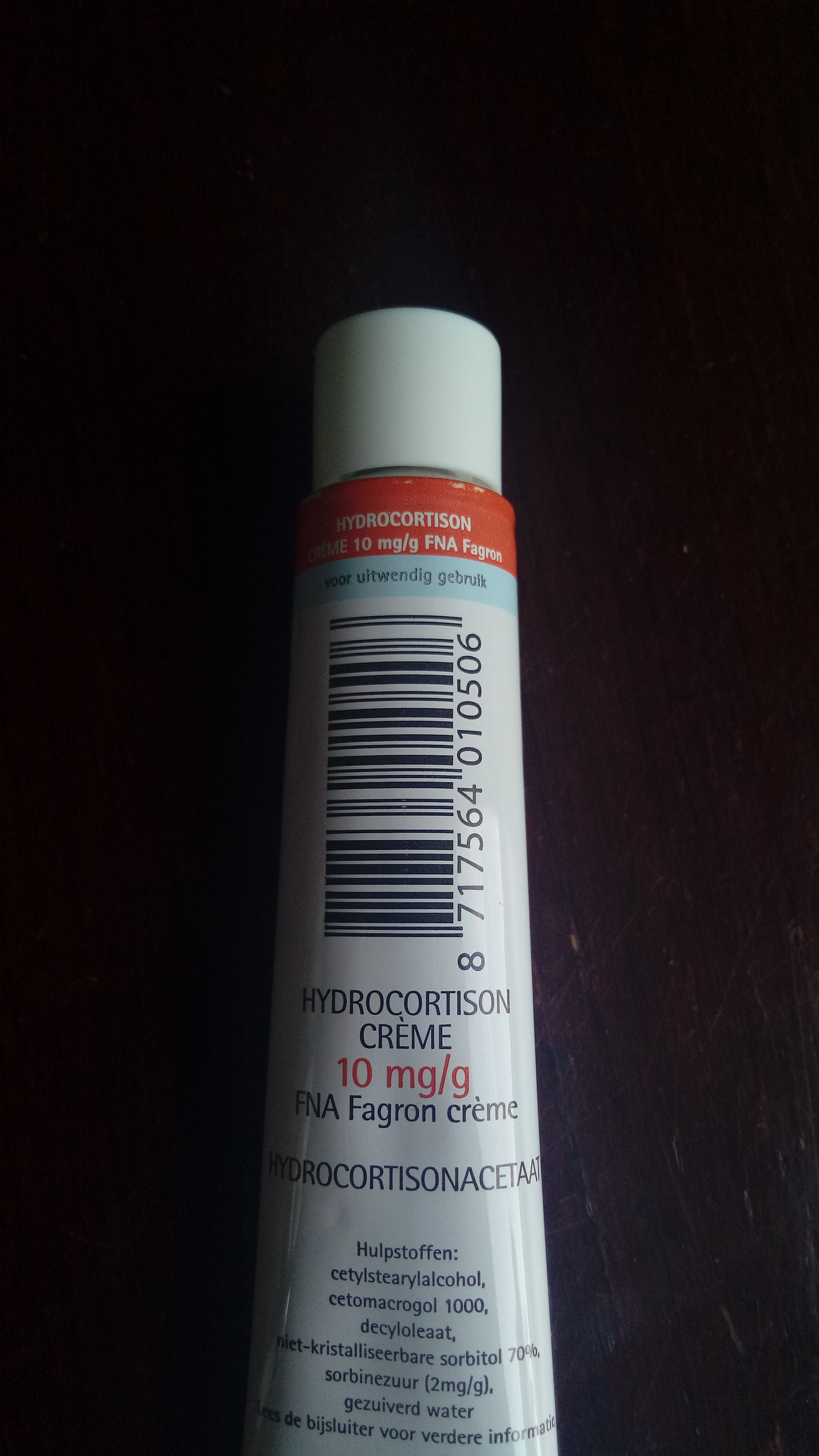
Corticosteroid creams can be applied directly on the skin to treat itch.

Topical formulations are preferred for treating localized itch caused by skin damage, inflammation or dryness. Topical antipruritics in the form of creams and sprays are often available over the counter. The active ingredients usually belong to these classes:

- Antihistamines such as diphenhydramine (Benadryl) and hydroxyzine
- Corticosteroids such as hydrocortisone topical cream, see topical steroid
- Counterirritants, such as mint oil, menthol, or camphor
- Local anesthetics such as lidocaine, pramoxine, or benzocaine in topical creams or lotions

Medication	Mechanism of Action	Examples
Corticosteroids	Suppresses itch originating from immune response and inflammation	Betamethasone; Hydrocortisone
Antihistamines	Antihistamines have anti-inflammatory properties that can relieve itching by suppressing the underlying inflammation	First generation: Chlorphenamine and diphenhydramine; Second generation: Fexofenadine
Anesthetics	Prevents the propagation of nerve signals that would otherwise cause an itching sensation	Pramoxine; Lidocaine/prilocaine
Phosphodiesterase-4 inhibitors	Suppresses inflammation to relieve itch	Roflumilast; Crisaborole
Capsaicin	Desensitizes nerves that cause itch	

=== Systemic drugs ===
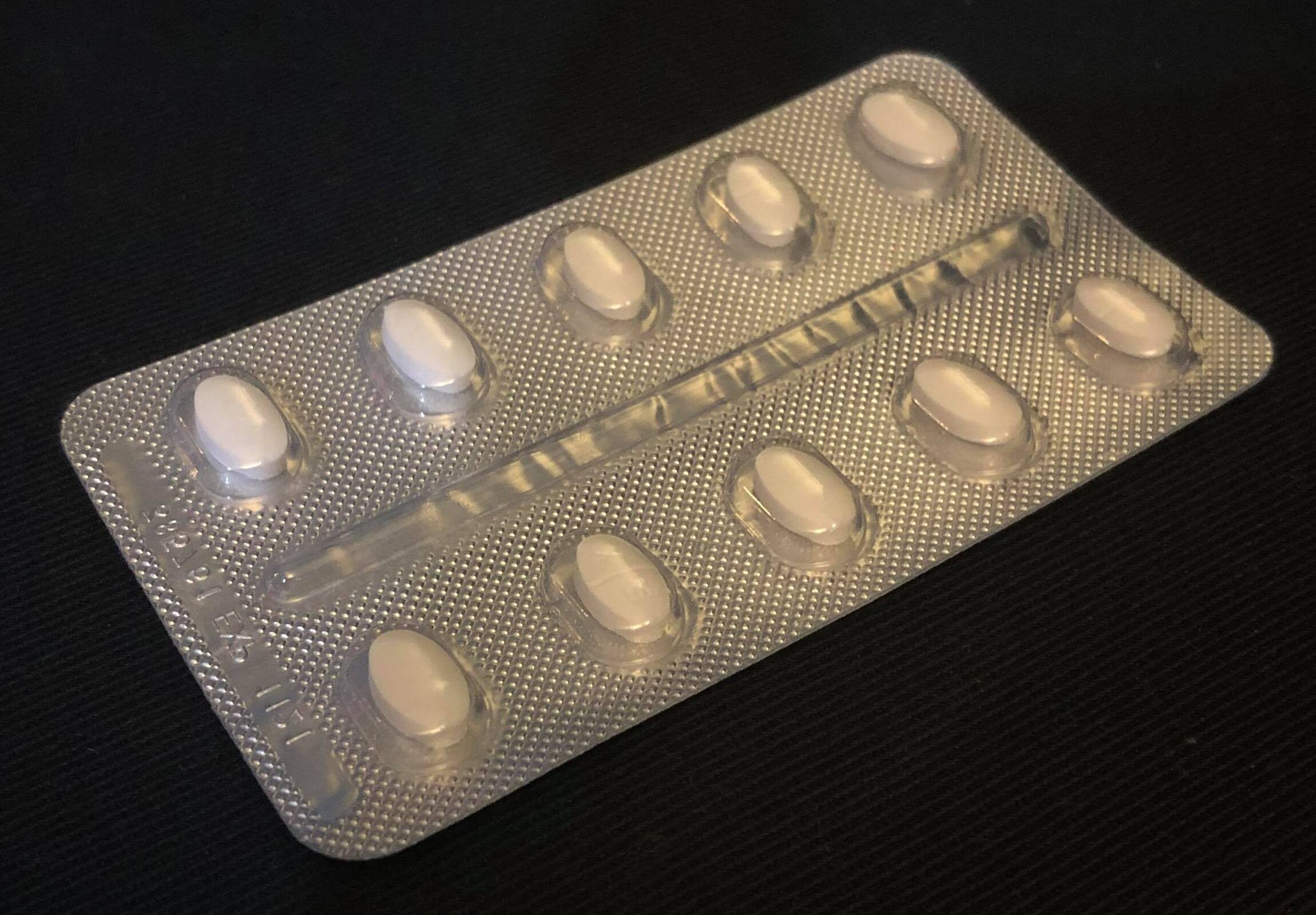
Antihistamines are commonly used to treat itching associated with allergies.

Generalized itch, or itching across the whole body, can be a symptom of a dermatological disorder or an underlying systemic problem. Some systemic diseases can that cause generalized itch include diabetes, hypothyroidism, kidney diseases and liver diseases. It is usually treated with systemic agents instead of topical agents. Corticosteroids and antihistamines mentioned above can also be used to treat generalized itch. Common systemic abirritants are listed below:

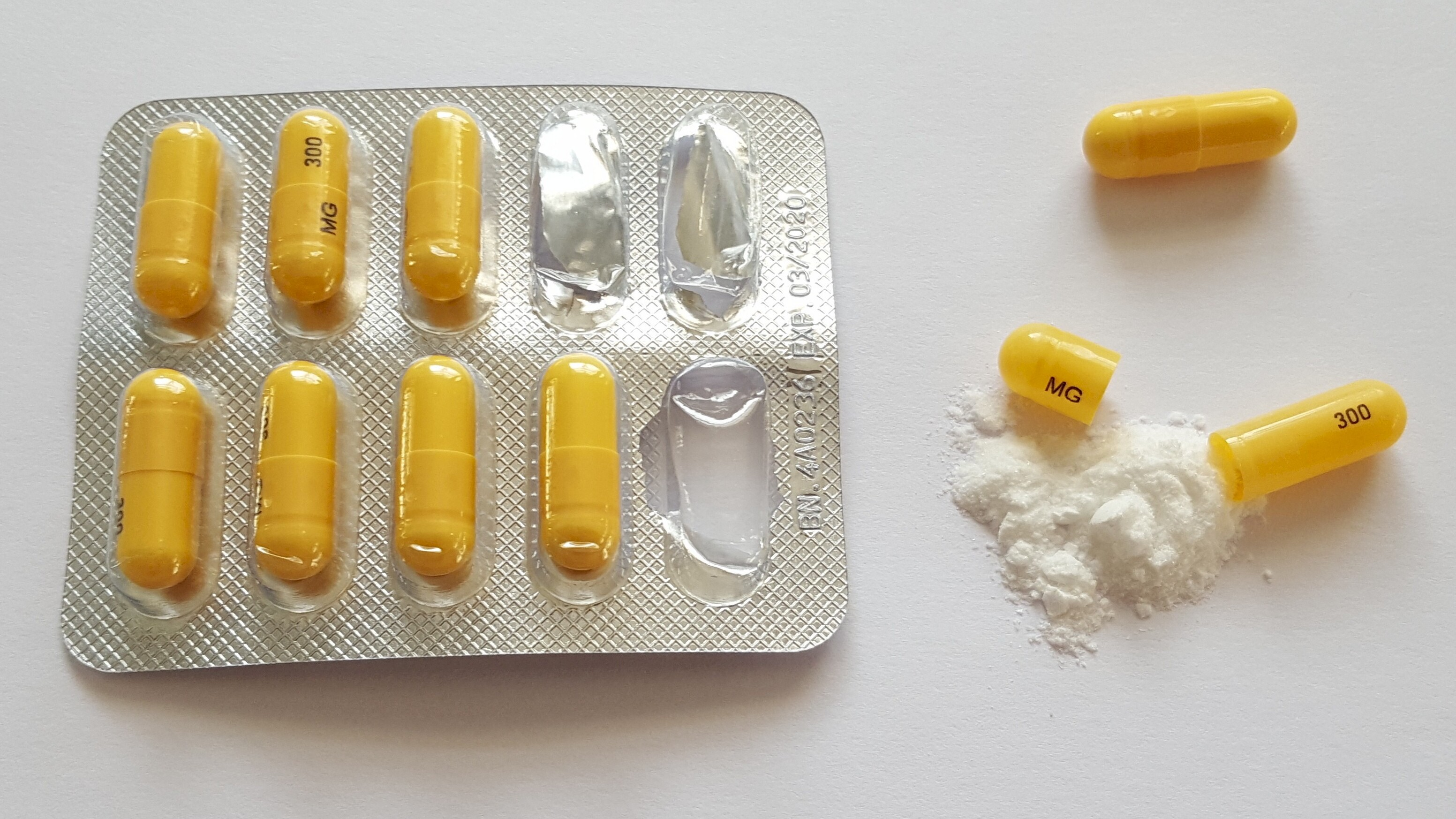
Gabapentin is an anticonvulsant which can also be used to treat itch.

Medication	Mechanism of Action	Examples
Corticosteroids	Suppresses itch originating from immune response and inflammation	Betamethasone; Hydrocortisone
Antihistamines	Antihistamines have anti-inflammatory properties that can relieve itching by suppressing the underlying inflammation	First generation: Chlorphenamine and diphenhydramine; Second generation: Fexofenadine
μ-opioid receptor antagonists	Blocks the μ-opioid receptor, the stimulation of which causes itch in clinical settings such as itch due to liver diseases	Naloxone; Naltrexone; Nalmefene
Antidepressants	Reduces itch by mediating serotonin and histamine levels in the body.	Two main classes of antidepressants are utilized to relieve itch: Atypical antidepressants acting on histamine receptors can useful in itching that occurs at night. An example is mirtazapine; Selective serotinin reuptake inhibitors (SSRIs) are often used in psychiatric patients with itching. Common SSRIs include fluoxetine and sertraline
Immunosuppressants	Suppresses the immune system to reduce inflammation and hence reduce itch	Cyclosporin
Anticonvulsants	Mechanism of action is unclear, but is thought to prevent itching by desensitizing calcium channels in nerves	Gabapentin; Pregabalin
Thalidomide	Thalidomide suppresses itching through a number of ways: Acts as a central depressant; Reduces inflammation; Modulates immune response; and; Modulates nerve signal transmission	
Butorphanol	Butorphanol activates the κ-opioid receptor and blocks the μ-opioid receptor, inhibiting generalized pruritus due to an imbalance between the μ- and κ-opioid systems	

Oral antipruritics are usually prescription drugs. Those more recently described include:

- Nalfurafine, a centrally-acting κ-opioid receptor agonist approved for uremic pruritus and effective in animal models of other prurituses
- Oclacitinib, a janus kinase inhibitor used to control pruritus in dogs.

== Substances proposed to act antipruritically, but not used medically ==
- Burow's solution, an astringent aqueous solution of aluminium triacetate, is shown to soothe and to relieve itching.
- Olive oil
- Jewelweed has been shown to be devoid of any anti-itch activity in several controlled studies.
- Calamine lotion, containing zinc oxide and iron(III) oxide, is a traditional remedy for mild itching, such as that typically associated with chicken pox – although the U.S. Food and Drug Administration has asserted that it has little if any scientific evidence. Nevertheless, they subsequently recommended applying topical OTC skin protectants, such as calamine, to relieve the itch caused by poisonous plants such as poison ivy, poison oak, and poison sumac.
- Paste of sodium bicarbonate (baking soda) and water, applied topically
- Ammonium hydroxide (household ammonia), applied topically
- Papain-based topical creams.

=== Alternative treatments ===
A number of herbs have been used to treat itching such as cannabis, pigweed (Portulaca oleracaea), ashoka (Saraca asoca), and fig (Ficus carica).

Other unconventional forms of treatment with potential efficacy for treating systemic itch include topical cannabinoids and H4 antihistamines.

== Effectiveness ==
Despite the availability of many forms of treatment, there is only a limited number of case series or small-scale studies examining the efficacy of abirritants. There is a lack of evidence on treatment for chronic pruritus of unknown origin. There is also little to no evidence on the efficacy and safety of using abirritants during pregnancy.

=== Treating itch associated with disease ===
Some abirritants work by indirectly treating itch through treating the causative medical conditions, which means that the itching associated with the condition will often subside when it is properly treated. This includes antihistamines and corticosteroids, which are effective in treating inflammatory disorders of the skin, in particular atopic dermatitis. Successful treatment of atopic dermatitis with either corticosteroids or antihistamines would resolve the associated itching.

=== Treating itch directly ===
Some abirritants treat pruritus directly without necessarily treating the causative medical condition. Abirritants that directly treat itching and are established to be effective are reported here in the table below:

Medication	Effectiveness
Gabapentin	Gabapentin was found to be effective in decreasing the severity of uremic pruritus compared to placebo.
Butorphanol	Continuous intravenous butorphanol reduced the incidence of morphine-induced pruritus significantly.
Thalidomide	Thalidomide is effective in treating chronic refractory pruritus among patients who had failed conventional therapy (corticosteroids or antihistamines), with a 50% or greater reduction in symptoms and a shorter time to improvement.
μ-opioid receptor antagonists	μ-opioid receptor antagonists such as naltrexone and nalmefene demonstrated significant improvement in treating patients with cholestatic pruritus, or itch arising from urticaria and atopic dermatitis.

=== Traditional Chinese medicine ===
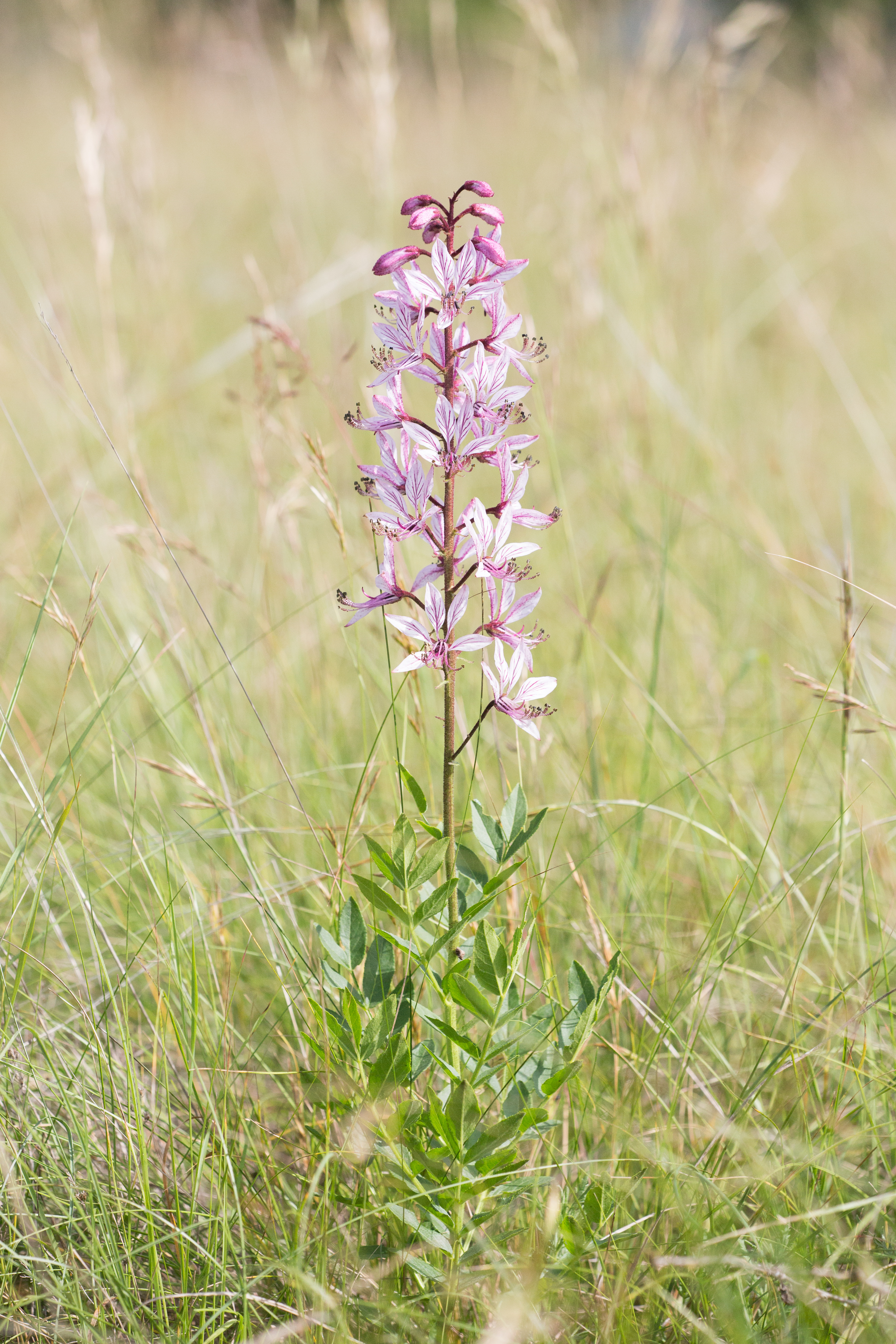
Dictamnus is one of the many herbs used to treat itch in traditional Chinese medicine

Traditional Chinese medicine is extensively used in Asia for relief of itch. It is believed that itching is caused by irritations from wind, dampness or blood stasis, and can be relieved by the use of herbs such as chrysanthemum, gardenia fruit, and mung bean. Sometimes these herbal remedies are used in combination with acupuncture and moxibustion, but their efficacy is still unclear. Sericin cream and oral omega-3 fatty acid supplements may show benefit in reducing itch.

== Adverse effects ==
Each class of abirritants has its own set of potential adverse effects.

=== Systemic corticosteroids ===
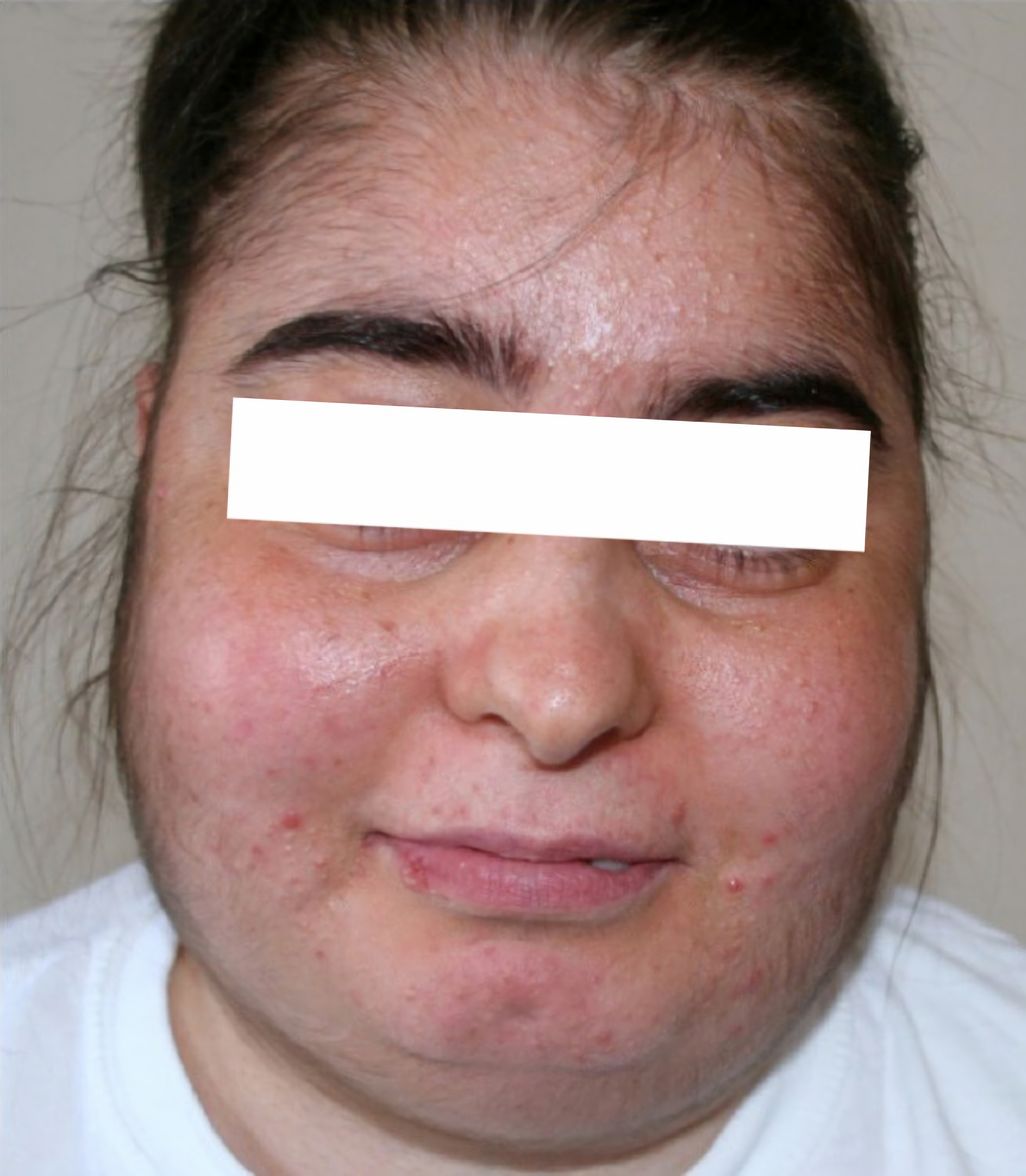
Systemic corticosteroid treatment can cause redistribution of fat tissue, leading to moon face.

Systemic corticosteroid use has been associated with a wide range of potential adverse effects. In a review article, the following common complications were noted for prolonged use: redistribution of fat tissues (moon face), high blood sugar, infections, delayed wound healing, and HPA axis suppression, where the body's natural production of hormones like corticotropin-releasing hormone and adrenocorticotropic hormone is suppressed as a response to the increased level of corticosteroids in the blood.

There is a lack of data on adverse effects associated with corticosteroid use of a shorter period and lower dose.

=== Topical corticosteroids ===
Both local and systemic side effects can result from topical corticosteroid use, especially in prolonged treatment.

Local side effects can occur regularly from prolonged use, which include skin atrophy (thinning), stretch marks, infections, lighter skin color, and sudden decrease in efficacy of the drug.

Systemic side effects are far less prevalent than local ones. Prolonged high potency corticosteroids use on thin skin, especially in children, increases the risk of systemic side effects since thin skin allows for greater absorption. One commonly cited systemic side effect from topical use is HPA axis suppression. A meta-analysis of topical corticosteroid use in children concluded that low-potency corticosteroid at recommended dosages and duration do not cause clinically significant HPA suppression.

=== Antihistamines ===
Antihistamines target the molecule histamine by blocking the histamine H1 receptor. First-generation antihistamines like diphenhydramine and chlorpheniramine are able to move from the blood into the brain across the blood–brain barrier, where they block the H1 receptor, reducing the neurotransmitter effect of histamine, leading to central nervous system side effects such as drowsiness and confusion. Second generation antihistamines, such as fexofenadine and cetirizine are less able to move from blood circulation into the brain and are therefore associated with fewer side effects in usual doses.

=== μ-Opioid receptor antagonists ===
μ-opioid receptor antagonists are usually well-tolerated and have no abuse potential since they do not cause physical dependence. Side effects are dose-dependent and generally limited to the first two weeks of treatment. Opioid withdrawal symptoms are rare and may include severe lightheadedness, depersonalization and anxiety.

=== Immunosuppressants ===
Immunosuppressants may cause immunodeficiency, resulting in an increased susceptibility to infection. Other side effects include bone marrow suppression, increased risk of cardiovascular disease and increased risk of cancer.

=== Capsaicin ===
Being the main chemical that causes heat in chili pepper, the main side effect of capsaicin is a burning sensation that usually persists for several days. A topical anaesthetic can be used to reduce the sensation. In addition, the topical anaesthetic can also provide anti-itch effect on its own.

== History ==
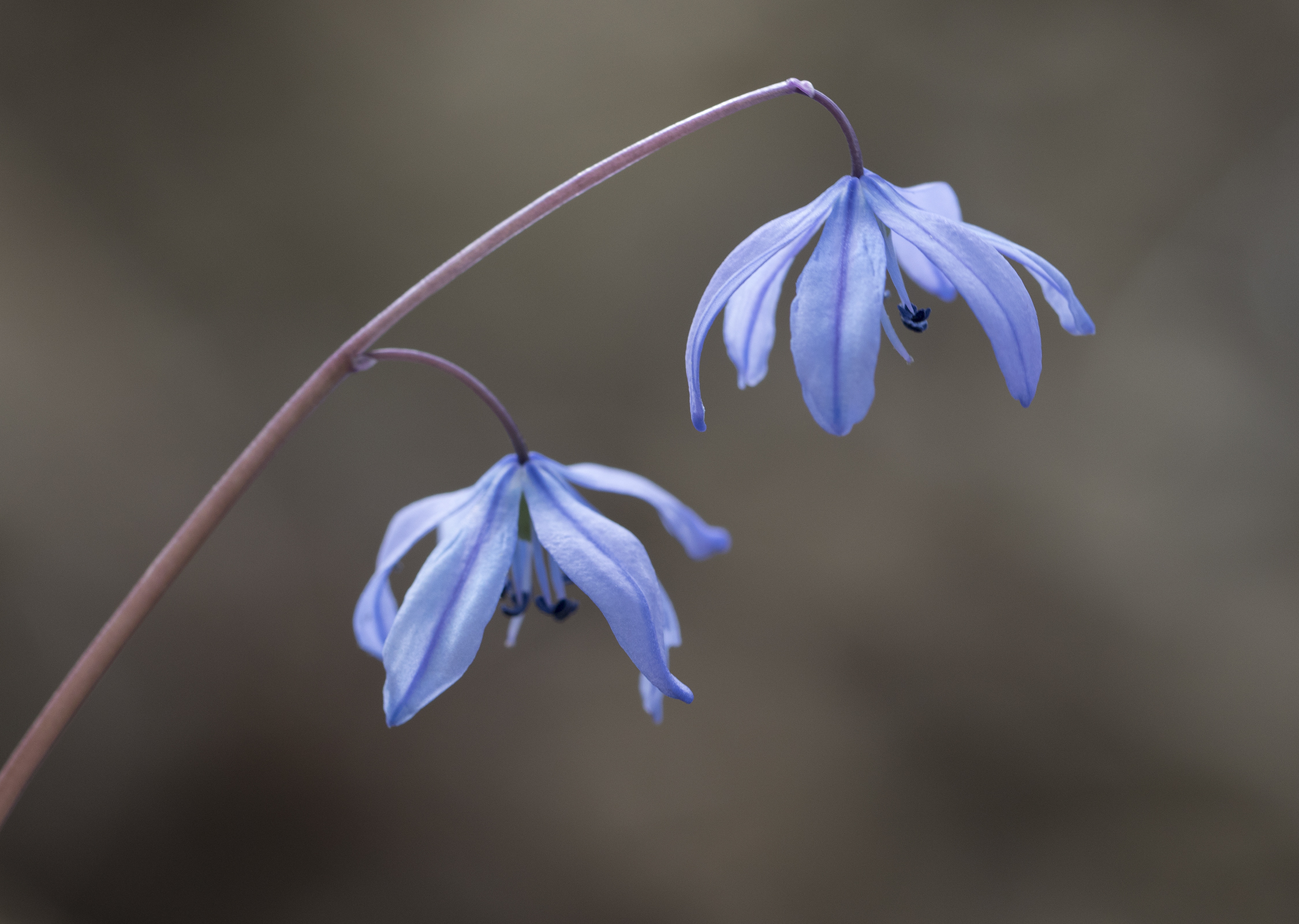
Squill was used to treat itch and is commonly listed in ancient pharmacopeia.

Abirritants have an extensive history in treating itch. The history of abirritants dates back to the Byzantine period, when Alexander of Tralleis, a famous physician, recommended crushed rue and alum mixed in honey for topical application to the scalp for itching caused by scabby conditions of the head.

During the 7th century, Paul of Aegina, a famous Greek physician, described a list of drugs for treatment of itch including plants such as the squill, metallic components, and goat droppings which were applied externally. These drugs are common in ancient pharmacopeia.

The Lorsch Pharmacopoeia written in the monastery of Lorsch in the 8th century described many preparations of abirritants for both systemic and topical use, such as an ointment prepared from stinging nettle seeds.

Mercury-coated girdles were used in the 17th century as an expensive treatment to alleviate symptoms of itch caused by scabies, but mercury toxins in the blood often caused other troubling symptoms in patients.

In the 20th century, many new abirritants for external use emerged, including salicylic acids, naphthol, tar, carbolic acid, thymol, and menthol, which were mostly available in the form of ointments. Alcohol and opium were also commonly prescribed.

== See also ==
- Itching
- Atopic dermatitis
