= Referred itch =

- Other names: Mitempfindung
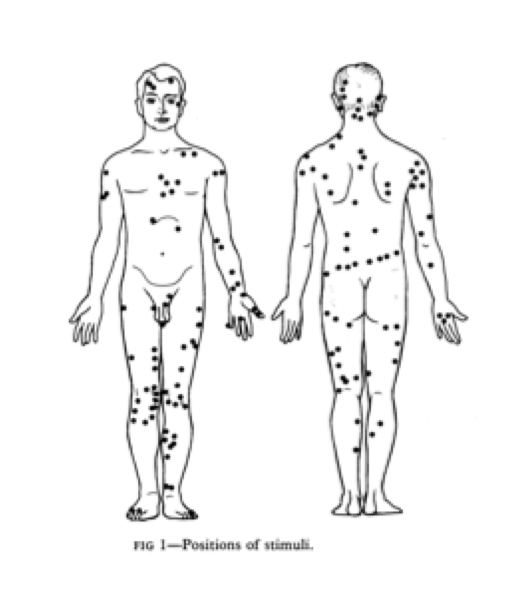
- A diagram showing the connected points between stimulus and itch.

Referred itch or mitempfindung is the phenomenon in which a stimulus applied in one region of the body is felt as an itch or irritation in a different part of the body. The syndrome is relatively harmless, though it can be irritating, and healthy individuals can express symptoms. Stimuli range from a firm pressure applied to the skin—a scratch—to irritation or pulling on a hair follicle on the skin. The referred sensation itself should not be painful; it is more of an irritating prickle leading to the compulsion to scratch the area. The stimulus and referred itch are ipsilateral (the stimulus and the referred itch occur on the same side of the body). Also, because scratching or putting pressure on the referred itch does not cause the stimulus area to itch, the relationship between the stimulus and the referred itch is unidirectional. The itching sensation is spontaneous and can cease with continued stimulation.

There are two types of referred itch: normal and acquired (pathological). Normal mitempfindung is usually detected in early childhood and persists for the majority, if not the rest, of the individual's life. Acquired or pathological mitempfindung is the effect of damage to the central nervous system and only lasts for a short period of time.

Symptoms are variable among affected individuals, but it is widely accepted that the soles of the feet, palms, and the face are never affected by mitempfindung. There is no evidence of genetic influence on referred itch. There is a published study, however, that mentions an affected man whose children were also affected. Much is still unknown about the physiological mechanisms of the phenomenon, and no single theory is accepted.

Research and information regarding mitempfindung is limited and dated. Most research on the topic was conducted in the late 19th century, and the most recent publications occurred in the late 1970s. A handful of studies were done in the early 1990s, but further data must be collected and interpreted before a thorough understanding of mitempfindung is reached.

== Signs and symptoms ==
=== Location of original itch and referred itch ===
The location of the reference point for each individual that experiences referred itch is well conserved and specific to each person, in that a certain location will elicit the phenomenon repeatedly for a given person while itches elsewhere may not. However, frequent and repetitive stimulation of the same original itch location can weaken the phenomenon, making the referred itch increasingly more discrete with each repeated trial. There is also no evidence of a relationship between the site of the original stimulus and that of the referred itch. Though the location of the referred itch may remain fairly constant and precise for a particular stimulus location on a single individual, there is no substantial evidence linking any two locations in a definite origin/referred location relationship. Thus, referral patterns are extremely variable and offer little to no indication of where a referred itch will occur if the location of the original itch is known. The phenomenon is unidirectional. Consequently, scratching an itch in a location that has previously served as the point of a referred itch does not induce an itch in the person's typical origination site.

=== Synesthesia and mitempfindung ===
Mitempfindung has been thought to be related to synesthesia in some individuals, specifically digit-color synesthesia. Digit-color synesthesia is a phenomenon in which affected individuals associate individual numbers with certain colors; individuals have been said to "count in colors."

Both synesthesia and mitempfindung develop in early childhood and are highly variable among individuals. Furthermore, synesthesia and mitempfindung are both unidirectional. A scratch on the trigger zone creates a referred sensation in a distant body part but not vice versa. Likewise, in synesthesia, a person's association of a number with a color does not mean that that color always evokes that number for them.

=== Normal and pathological referred itch ===
Referred itch is the class of referred sensation that focuses on the situation in which an itch in one place on the body simultaneously triggers an itch in a different location. Other examples of referred sensation include sensations of temperature, pain, and pressure. Referred itch is commonly observed in completely healthy individuals and can often go unnoticed depending upon the particular person's self-awareness of their itches and the causes of those itches. The ephemeral nature of referred itch and its restriction to a very small area on one's body (the itch is precisely located, it does not induce widespread itching) make it difficult to document or even notice.

The majority of the cases of referred itch studied by experimenters occur in healthy individuals. Furthermore, referred itch itself does not confer any adverse effects on the health of those experiencing it. With the exception of the annoyance of feeling multiple itches and a potentially minuscule feeling of pain, it is an innocuous condition. The cause of referred itch in healthy individuals is still not known for certain, but there are a multiple recorded cases of referred itch being triggered by certain pathological stimuli.

Two men developed temporary referred sensation following shingles. Here, the referred sensation occurred in the areas previously affected by the shingles. Another man who had hyperpathia and reduced nerve functioning later experienced referred itch in conjunction with his pathology. This evidence suggests that although referred itch occurs spontaneously in healthy individuals, certain pathologies make it possible to acquire the condition, even if only temporarily.

== Causes ==
Itch (pruritus) has many causes. Allergies and inflammatory skin disease all produce itch as a symptom. Pathophysiologically, the sensation of the itch is poorly understood. Nevertheless, there are many known inducers of itch. Histamine is widely known as an inducer of the itch sensation. Other substances known to induce itch are substance P, cytokines, and proteases.

Temperature also has an effect. It is conventional opinion that applied cold temperature inhibits itch by inhibiting C-fiber activity. However, studies have also described paradoxical phenomena associated with temperature and itch, where applied short-term moderate cold temperature stimulus enhanced the itch. Such a phenomenon might be explained by "paradoxical heat", which is when one has the perception of heat when, in fact, the skin is innocuously cooled. Thus, the exact effect of temperature on itch remains unclear, with different levels of heat and cold proven to both enhance and inhibit itch.

Alcohol is known to have close interactions with histamine release. Alcohol both stimulates the release of histamine from mast cells and inhibits its degradations by inhibiting diamine oxidase. Though histamine is used by the body to mediate alcohol-induced gastric and intestinal damage as well as alcohol flushing, it is possible that elevated levels of histamine might have a correlation with referred itch (or even itch in general).

== Mechanisms ==
An itch, also known as pruritus, is classified as a sensory stimulation to scratch a certain area of the skin. An itch can be a fleeting sensation, as with a random tickle or prick, or persistent, as with a rash such as eczema or other skin irritant such as an allergen. Itch has been demonstrated to be closely related to pain and to share many of its physiological mechanisms. The relationship between pain and itch is evident in the fact that itch sensations occur along a similar neurological and sensory pathway as sensations of pain, and the fact that individuals who are insensitive to pain are also insensitive to itch.

Itch is induced by mechanical, chemical, thermal, or electrical stimuli of sensory receptors in the peripheral nervous system, or by psychological prompts. The receptors that are responsible for the sensation of itch caused by environmental stimuli are found within the upper layers of the skin. Once stimulated, usually by histamine within the body, a signal is sent through the peripheral nervous system to the brain (thalamus), where the information is processed and the command for the bodily response is issued. Itch can also originate as a result of damage to the nervous system (central or peripheral) or in response to the presence of excess opioids.

Because of the scarcity of research available on mitempfindung, there is no widely accepted theory on how the referral of sensation is manifested. There are, however, a wide range of hypotheses which carry traction within the scientific community.

One proposed mechanism implicates the nerve and its branches. At the cellular level, this hypothesis postulates that abnormal branching of neurons occurs during embryogenesis. During development, the branch of an afferent article may travel unusually far in the nervous system. Thus, in an individual with a fully developed nervous system, the stimulus at the end of one branch may be interpreted as coming from a point of ending in another, distant, part of the body. Again, research has not been done to prove this hypothesis as valid or invalid.

There is an untested hypothesis that claims that referred itch uses the spinocervical tract pathway. The cells in this tract lie in the dorsal horn of the spinal cord, and its axons run in the ipsilateral and dorsolateral quadrant, which is consistent with observations that stimuli in the trigger points are ipsilateral to the sites of referred sensations. These axons project to the thalamus and midbrain, suggesting that the thalamus is involved in the phenomenon. The cells in this tract are also excited by mechanical stimuli, lending support that this pathway can explain the mechanism of referred itch. Central neuronal damage to this area – either direct or secondary to peripheral nerve damage – makes it an area of focal hyperexcitability or reduced inhibition. This hypothesis has been found to be unlikely because there would be an expected progression of itches (i.e., from legs to trunk, and from trunk to neck). However, there is no symmetrical distribution found between trigger zones and sites of referred sensation.

There is great support behind the idea of the thalamus affecting mitempfindung. Because of the arrangement of sensory regions in the thalamus, there may be a spread of excitation in this brain region. Studies have shown that the thalamic region dedicated to the trunk is found between the regions supporting sensation from the arms and legs. This supports the finding that trigger zones in the chest area lead to referred sensation in the legs. And since the thalamic region for the face lies in a separate area called the arcuate nucleus, this explains why the face remains unaffected by referred itch.

Some spread in association within the cerebral cortex may also explain the large distances between trigger points and referred sensation sites. In the precentral area where the homunculus rests, it is known that hand and shoulder areas overlap the trunk area. And the area of the thumb overlaps that of the upper part of the tongue. There is a published case in which stimulation in the thumb led to a referred sensation in the upper part of the tongue.

== Management ==
The origin of referred itch is unknown, whether it be neuropathic (originating in the brain), pruritoceptic (originating at the skin), or disease related, so treatment for it specifically still remains unclear. Nevertheless, treatment for different kinds of itch, some of which may be applicable to referred itch, are available. Note that people with this symptom should seek medical care and consult appropriate medications with a doctor.

Aspirin taken orally has minimal effect on itch.

Therapeutic options for itch that originates in the central nervous system are limited, and need further confirmation, but are in general based on the counteracting interaction between itch and pain via the spine. Treatments of low dosage lidocaine and gabapentin might be effective in relieving itch that is thought to originate in the central nervous system.

== Epidemiology ==
The prevalence of mitempfindung is difficult to determine exactly, because many individuals would not be aware of having referred itch until the phenomenon is explained to them. Consequently, variability exists within the scientific literature as to the actual prevalence of referred itch in humans. Mittelmann (1920) has reported that 8 out of 9 people questioned experienced referred sensations. In 1973, Sterling reported that about half of 20 healthy individuals questioned had mitempfindung.

The variability and heterogeneous characteristic of mitempfindung among individuals makes it difficult to determine a precise set of identifying symptoms of the disease, or a set of risk factors. Nevertheless, mitempfindung is thought to be extremely common.

== History ==
The term mitempfindungen (literally "associated sensations") was first used in 1844 by the German scientist Johannes Müller. "Referred itch" was only used after 1884, in context to the research of Russian physiologist N. Kowalewsky. The phenomenon of referred itch was documented as early as 1733. Around that time, the English scientist Stephen Hales observed that when an area of the body was scratched by the nails, an itching sensation could be triggered on a distant part of the body. He had called the phenomenon the many "Instances of the Sympathy of the Nerves." More extensive observations on the referral of sensation were documented by Kowalewsky, who observed referred sensations on himself. Kowalewsky published his findings in 1884.

== Current research ==
Although referred itch was first observed nearly 280 years ago, its cause and mechanism between stimulus and referred itch still remain vague and unproven. Up to this point, the most convincing evidence points toward the thalamus, sympathetic nervous system, and chemical signals (like histamine) as the major aspects of our physiology responsible for the phenomenon, as explained above. Increasing knowledge of itching in general and its similarities with pain in the future could help to reveal some of what is unknown about referred itch, as could a better understanding of histamine and the C-fibers' involvement with itch sensations. Without question, there is a need for further experimentation and study to be directed at referred itch, particularly as the body of evidence pertaining to it is scattered and often inconclusive.
