= Depolarization =

Change in a cell's electric charge distribution

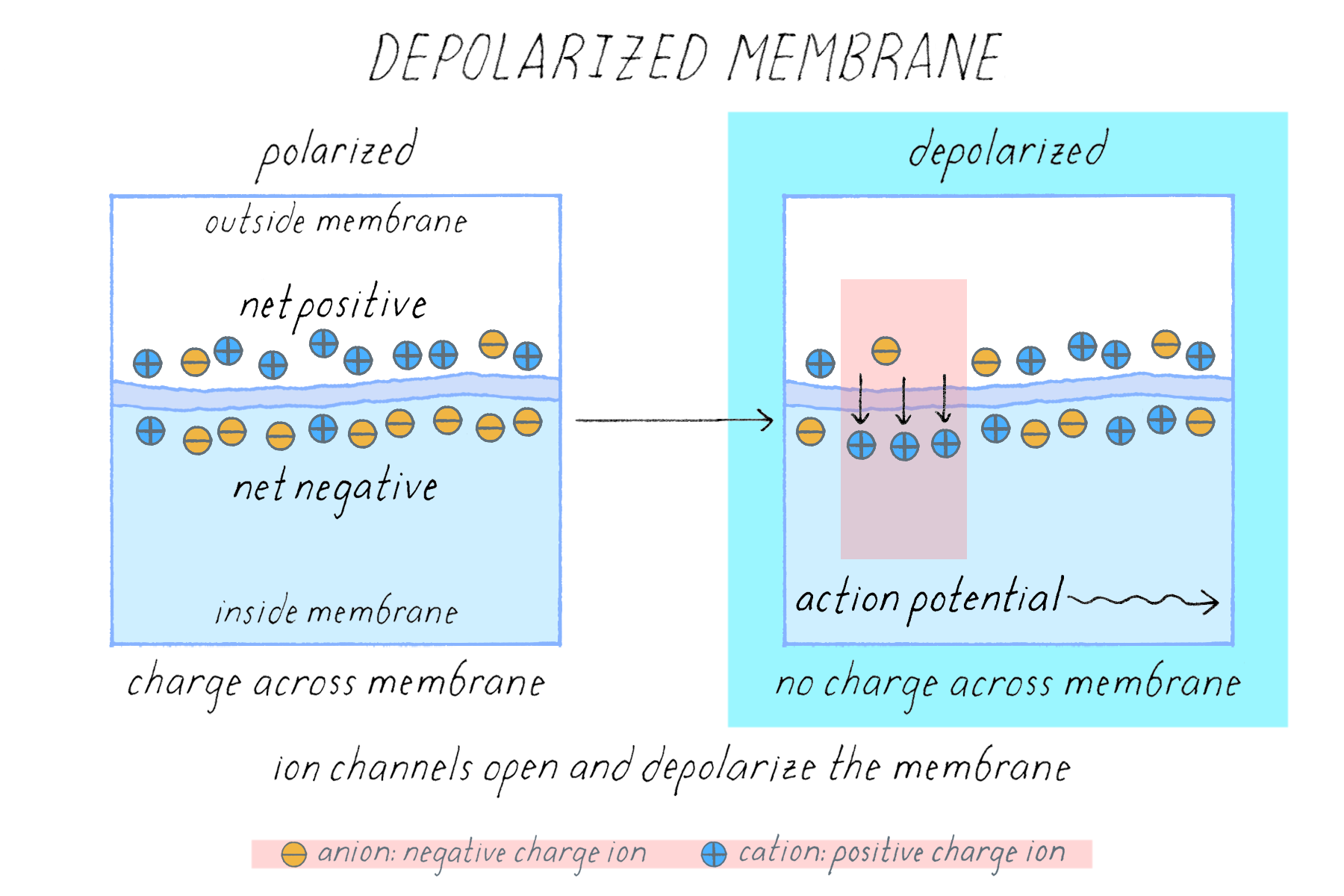
Membrane depolarization is the reduction or reversal of a cell’s resting membrane potential, caused by the influx of positively-charged ions, making the inside of the cell less negatively charged relative to the outside.

In biology, depolarization or hypopolarization is a change within a cell, during which the cell undergoes a shift in electric charge distribution, resulting in less negative charge inside the cell compared to the outside. Depolarization is essential to the function of many cells, communication between cells, and the overall physiology of an organism. It is especially important to electrical signaling in neurons and muscle cells. It also affects many non-excitable cells by changing calcium regulation or gene expression.

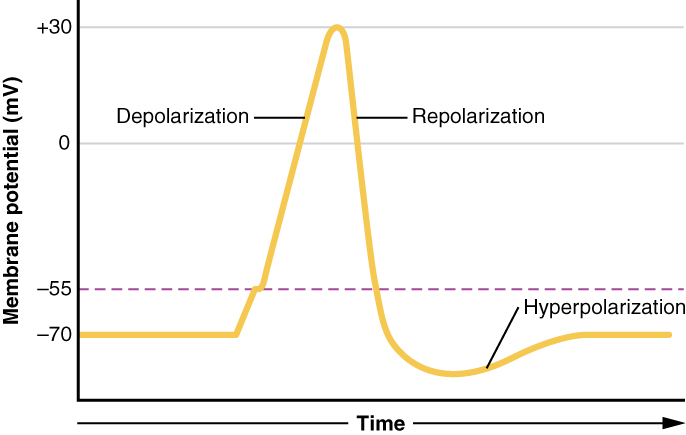
Action potential in a neuron, showing depolarization, in which the cell's internal charge becomes less negative (more positive), and repolarization, where the internal charge returns to a more negative value.

Most cells in higher organisms maintain an internal environment that is negatively charged relative to the cell's exterior. This difference in charge is called the cell's membrane potential. In the process of depolarization, the negative internal charge of the cell temporarily becomes more positive (less negative). This shift from a negative to a more positive membrane potential occurs during several processes, including an action potential. During an action potential, the depolarization is so large that the potential difference across the cell membrane briefly reverses polarity, with the inside of the cell becoming positively charged.

The change in charge typically occurs due to an influx of sodium ions into a cell, although it can be mediated by an influx of any kind of cation or efflux of any kind of anion. The opposite of a depolarization is called a hyperpolarization.

Usage of the term "depolarization" in biology differs from its use in physics, where it refers to situations in which any form of electrical polarity ( i.e. the presence of any electrical charge, whether positive or negative) changes to a value of zero.

Depolarization is sometimes referred to as "hypopolarization" (as opposed to hyperpolarization).

== Physiology ==
The process of depolarization is entirely dependent upon the intrinsic electrical nature of most cells. When a cell is at rest, the cell maintains what is known as a resting potential. The resting potential generated by nearly all cells results in the interior of the cell having a negative charge compared to the exterior of the cell. To maintain this electrical imbalance, ions are transported across the cell's plasma membrane. The transport of the ions across the plasma membrane is accomplished through several different types of transmembrane proteins embedded in the cell's plasma membrane that function as pathways for ions both into and out of the cell, such as ion channels, sodium potassium pumps, and voltage-gated ion channels.

=== Resting potential ===
The resting potential must be established within a cell before the cell can be depolarized. There are many mechanisms by which a cell can establish a resting potential, however there is a typical pattern of generating this resting potential that many cells follow. The generation of a negative resting potential within the cell involves the utilization of ion channels, ion pumps, and voltage-gated ion channels by the cell. However, the process of generating the resting potential within the cell also creates an environment outside the cell that favors depolarization. The sodium potassium pump is largely responsible for the optimization of conditions on both the interior and the exterior of the cell for depolarization. This pump is an ATPase that pumps three sodium ions out of the cell and two potassium ions into the cell with every ATP consumed.

By pumping three positively charged sodium ions (Na^{+}) out of the cell for every two positively charged potassium ions (K^{+}) pumped into the cell, not only is the resting potential of the cell established, as the interior of the cell becomes less positive due to the +1 charge that is lost with each ATP molecule, but an unfavorable concentration gradient is created by increasing the concentration of sodium outside the cell and increasing the concentration of potassium within the cell. While there is an excessive amount of potassium in the cell and sodium outside the cell, the generated resting potential maintains the closure of voltage-gated ion channels in the plasma membrane. This not only prevents the diffusion of ions pumped across the membrane but also involves the activity of potassium leak channels, allowing a controlled passive efflux of potassium ions, which contributes to the establishment of the negative resting potential. Additionally, despite the high concentration of positively-charged potassium ions, most cells contain internal components (of negative charge), which accumulate to establish a negative inner charge.

=== Depolarization ===
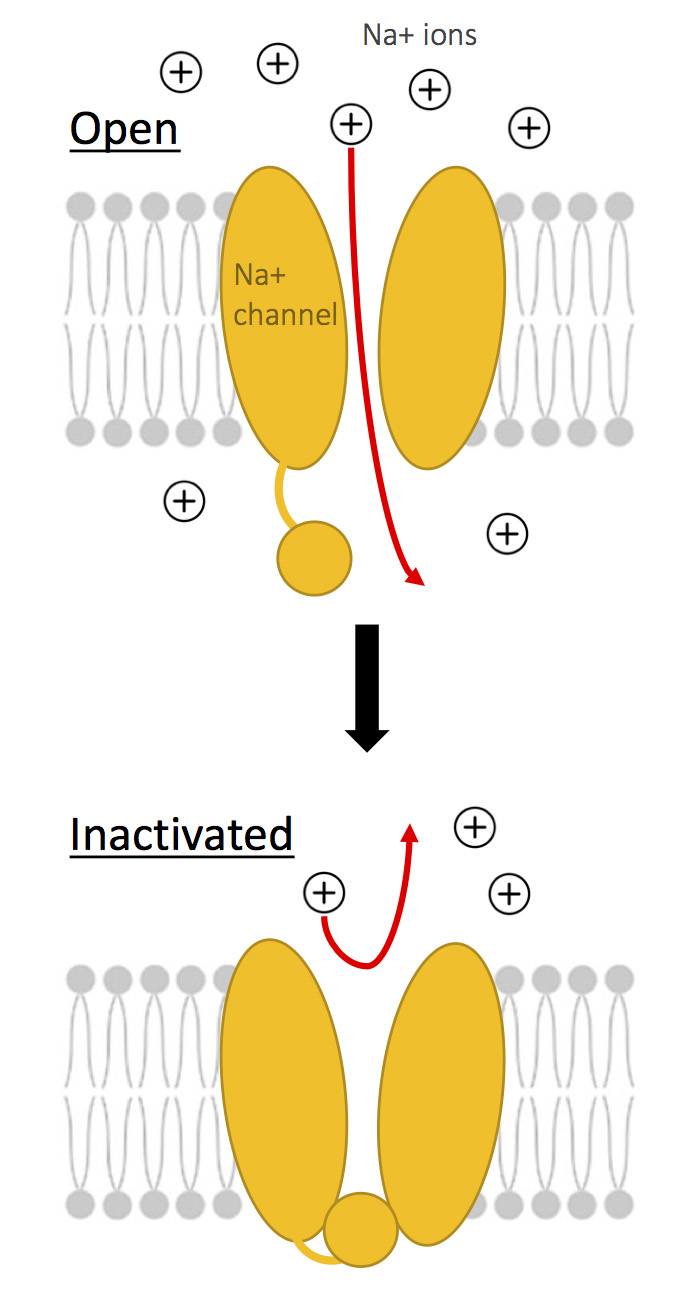
Voltage-gated sodium channel. Open channel (top) carries an influx of Na^{+} ions, giving rise to depolarization. As the channel becomes closed/inactivated (bottom), the depolarization ends.

After a cell has established a resting potential, that cell has the capacity to undergo depolarization. Depolarization is the process by which the membrane potential becomes less negative, facilitating the generation of an action potential. For this rapid change to take place within the interior of the cell, several events must occur along the plasma membrane of the cell.

While the sodium–potassium pump continues to work, the voltage-gated sodium and calcium channels that had been closed while the cell was at resting potential are opened in response to an initial change in voltage. As a change in the neuronal charge leads to the opening of voltage-gated sodium channels, this results in an influx of sodium ions down their electrochemical gradient. Sodium ions enter the cell, and they contribute a positive charge to the cell interior, causing a change in the membrane potential from negative to positive. The initial sodium ion influx triggers the opening of additional sodium channels (positive-feedback loop), leading to further sodium ion transfer into the cell and sustaining the depolarization process until the positive equilibrium potential is reached.

Sodium channels possess an inherent inactivation mechanism that prompts rapid reclosure, even as the membrane remains depolarized. During this equilibrium, the sodium channels enter an inactivated state, temporarily halting the influx of sodium ions until the membrane potential becomes negatively charged again. Once the cell's interior is sufficiently positively charged, depolarization concludes, and the channels close once more.

=== Repolarization ===
After a cell has been depolarized, it undergoes one final change in internal charge. Following depolarization, the voltage-gated sodium ion channels that had been open while the cell was undergoing depolarization close again. The increased positive charge within the cell now causes the potassium channels to open. Potassium ions (K^{+}) begin to move down the electrochemical gradient (in favor of the concentration gradient and the newly established electrical gradient). As potassium moves out of the cell the potential within the cell decreases and approaches its resting potential once more. The sodium potassium pump works continuously throughout this process.

=== In Summary ===
1. Trigger: an excitatory signal makes the membrane potential less negative
2. Upstroke: once threshold is reached, voltage-gated sodium channels open, causing sodium influx and rapid depolarization
3. Peak and Inactivation: sodium channels quickly inactivate, stopping the sodium influx even if the membrane remains depolarized
4. Repolarization: voltage-gated potassium channels open, mostly with a delay, potassium exits the cell, and the membrane potential returns toward rest
5. Hyperpolarization: potassium can remain elevated briefly, making the membrane more negative than resting before it settles back

== Hyperpolarization ==
The process of repolarization causes an overshoot in the potential of the cell. Potassium ions continue to move out of the axon so much that the resting potential is exceeded and the new cell potential becomes more negative than the resting potential. The resting potential is ultimately re-established by the closing of all voltage-gated ion channels and the activity of the sodium potassium ion pump.

== Neurons ==
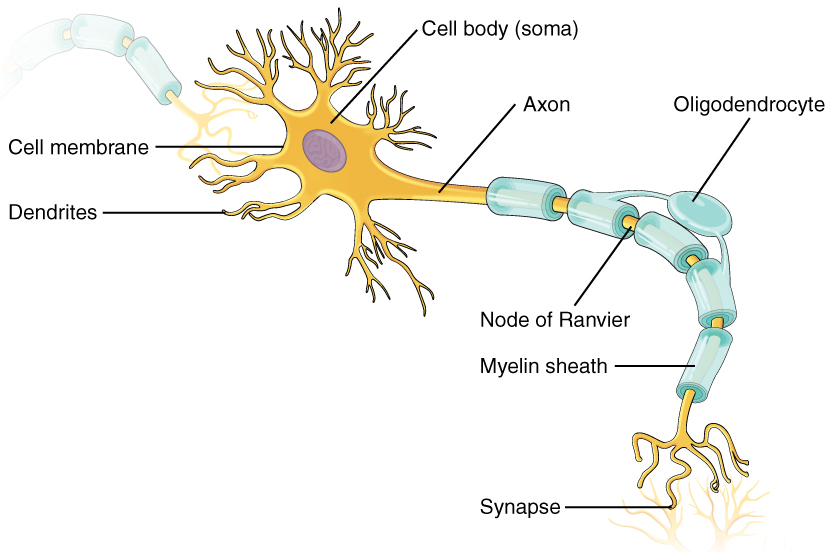
Structure of a neuron

Depolarization is essential to the functions of many cells in the human body, which is exemplified by the transmission of stimuli both within a neuron and between two neurons. The reception of stimuli, neural integration of those stimuli, and the neuron's response to stimuli all rely upon the ability of neurons to utilize depolarization to transmit stimuli either within a neuron or between neurons.

=== Response to stimulus ===
Stimuli to neurons can be physical, electrical, or chemical, and can either inhibit or excite the neuron being stimulated. An inhibitory stimulus is transmitted to the dendrite of a neuron, causing hyperpolarization of the neuron. The hyperpolarization following an inhibitory stimulus causes a further decrease in voltage within the neuron below the resting potential. By hyperpolarizing a neuron, an inhibitory stimulus results in a greater negative charge that must be overcome for depolarization to occur.

Excitation stimuli, on the other hand, increase the voltage in the neuron, which leads to a neuron that is easier to depolarize than the same neuron in the resting state. Regardless of it being excitatory or inhibitory, the stimulus travels down the dendrites of a neuron to the cell body for integration.

=== Integration of stimuli ===
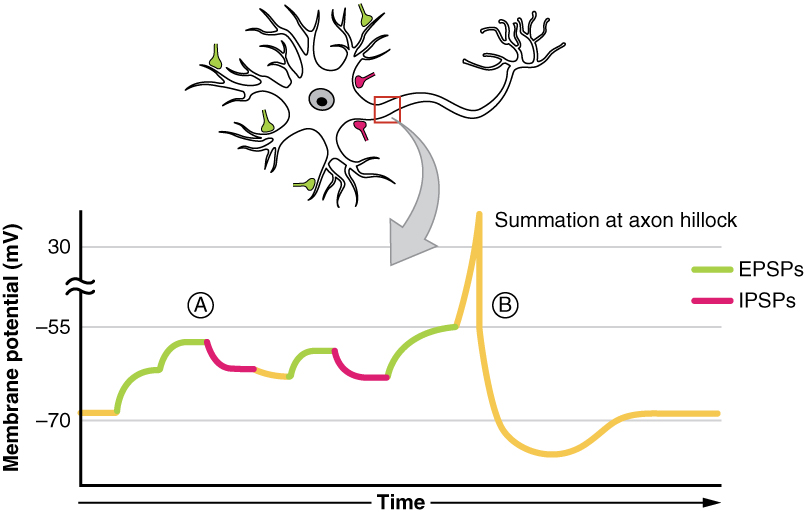
Summation of stimuli at an axon hillock

Once the stimuli have reached the cell body, the nerve must integrate the various stimuli before the nerve can respond. The stimuli that have traveled down the dendrites converge at the axon hillock, where they are summed to determine the neuronal response. If the sum of the stimuli reaches a certain voltage, known as the threshold potential, depolarization continues from the axon hillock down the axon.

=== Response ===
The surge of depolarization traveling from the axon hillock to the axon terminal is known as an action potential. Action potentials reach the axon terminal, where the action potential triggers the release of neurotransmitters from the neuron. The neurotransmitters that are released from the axon continue on to stimulate other cells such as other neurons or muscle cells. After an action potential travels down the axon of a neuron, the resting membrane potential of the axon must be restored before another action potential can travel the axon. This is known as the recovery period of the neuron, during which the neuron cannot transmit another action potential.

=== Rod cells of the eye ===
The importance and versatility of depolarization within cells can be seen in the relationship between rod cells in the eye and their associated neurons. When rod cells are in the dark, they are depolarized. In the rod cells, this depolarization is maintained by ion channels that remain open due to the higher voltage of the rod cell in the depolarized state. The ion channels allow calcium and sodium to pass freely into the cell, maintaining the depolarized state. Rod cells in the depolarized state constantly release neurotransmitters which in turn stimulate the nerves associated with rod cells. This cycle is broken when rod cells are exposed to light; the absorption of light by the rod cell causes the channels that had facilitated the entry of sodium and calcium into the rod cell to close. When these channels close, the rod cells produce fewer neurotransmitters, which is perceived by the brain as an increase in light. Therefore, in the case of rod cells and their associated neurons, depolarization actually prevents a signal from reaching the brain as opposed to stimulating the transmission of the signal.

== Heart ==
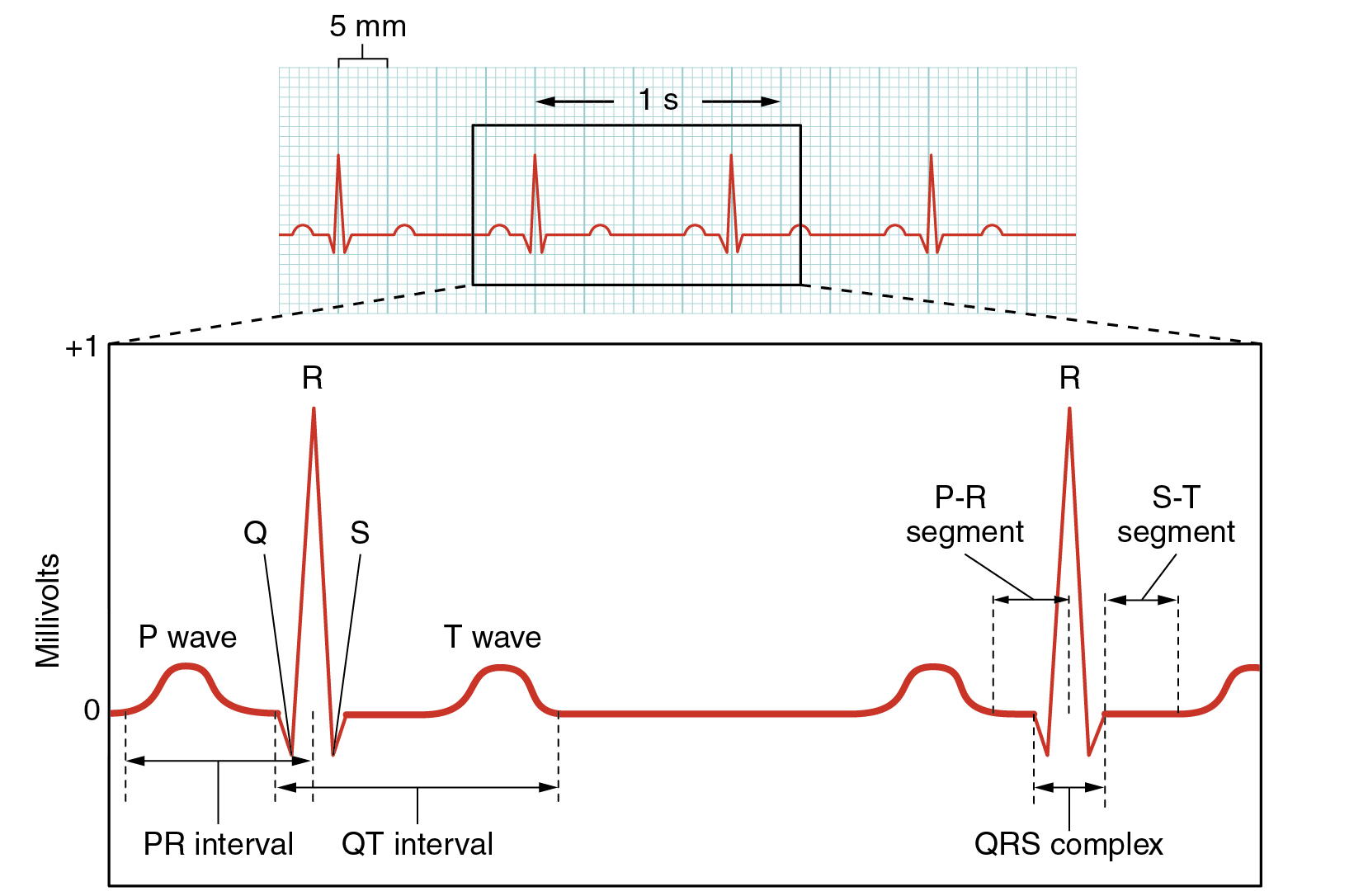
Electrocardiogram

Depolarization occurs in the four chambers of the heart: both atria first, and then both ventricles.

1. The sinoatrial (SA) node on the wall of the right atrium initiates depolarization in the right and left atria, causing contraction, which corresponds to the P wave on an electrocardiogram.
2. The SA node sends the depolarization wave to the atrioventricular (AV) node which—with about a 100 ms delay to let the atria finish contracting—then causes contraction in both ventricles, seen in the QRS wave. At the same time, the atria re-polarize and relax.
3. The ventricles are re-polarized and relaxed at the T wave.

This process continues regularly, unless there is a problem in the heart.

In a normal ECG:

- P wave: atrial depolarization
- T wave: ventricular repolarization
- Atrial repolarization: not seen clearly because it is masked by the QRS complex
- QRS complex: ventricular depolarization

== Depolarization blockers ==
There are drugs, called depolarization blocking agents, that cause prolonged depolarization by opening channels responsible for depolarization and not allowing them to close, preventing repolarization. Examples include the nicotinic agonists, suxamethonium and decamethonium. Succinylcholine (suxamethonium) activates nicotinic acetylcholine receptors and keeps the endplate depolarized. It functionally blocks transmission because voltage-gated sodium channels remain inactivated. Decamethonium is an older depolarizing blocker with a similar principle and of interest for many researchers.
