= Summation (neurophysiology) =

Process in neuroscience

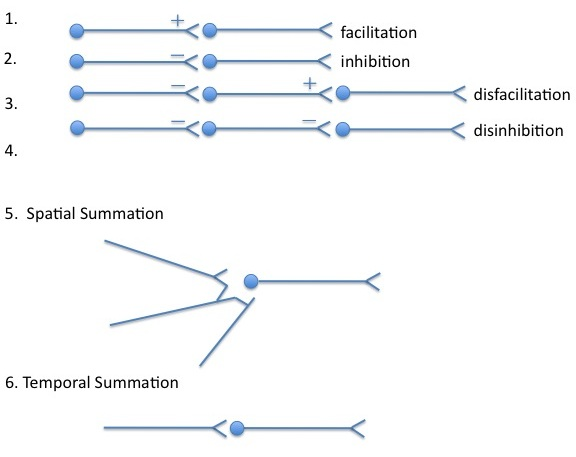
Basic ways that neurons can interact with each other when converting input to output

Summation, which includes both spatial summation and temporal summation, is the process that determines whether or not an action potential will be generated by the combined effects of excitatory and inhibitory signals, both from multiple simultaneous inputs (spatial summation), and from repeated inputs (temporal summation). Depending on the sum total of many individual inputs, summation may or may not reach the threshold voltage to trigger an action potential.

Neurotransmitters released from the terminals of a presynaptic neuron fall under one of two categories, depending on the ion channels gated or modulated by the neurotransmitter receptor. Excitatory neurotransmitters produce depolarization of the postsynaptic cell, whereas the hyperpolarization produced by an inhibitory neurotransmitter will mitigate the effects of an excitatory neurotransmitter. This depolarization is called an EPSP, or an excitatory postsynaptic potential, and the hyperpolarization is called an IPSP, or an inhibitory postsynaptic potential.

Older models of neurons treated them mostly as simple integrators that just add up signals without much going on. Dendrites change that picture a lot. Modern studies point out they are not passive at all. They act like active parts that handle computations on their own. It seems like through voltage-gated channels, they manage this nonlinear summation. That allows for some local processing right there in the dendrites. Signals do not even make it to the axon hillock until after that step. The idea is dendrites do real work before everything else kicks in. Traditional views missed how dynamic that is.

The only influences that neurons can have on one another are excitation, inhibition, and—through modulatory transmitters—biasing one another's excitability. From such a small set of basic interactions, a chain of neurons can produce only a limited response. A pathway can be facilitated by excitatory input; removal of such input constitutes disfacillitation. A pathway may also be inhibited; removal of inhibitory input constitutes disinhibition, which, if other sources of excitation are present in the inhibitory input, can augment excitation.

== History ==
The nervous system first began to be encompassed within the scope of general physiological studies in the late 1800s, when Charles Sherrington began to test neurons' electrical properties. His main contributions to neurophysiology involved the study of the knee-jerk reflex and the inferences he made between the two reciprocal forces of excitation and inhibition. He postulated that the site where this modulatory response occurs is the intercellular space of a unidirectional pathway of neural circuits. He first introduced the possible role of evolution and neural inhibition with his suggestion that "higher centers of the brain inhibit the excitatory functions of the lower centers".

Much of today's knowledge of chemical synaptic transmission was gleaned from experiments analyzing the effects of acetylcholine release at neuromuscular junctions, also called end plates. The pioneers in this area included Bernard Katz and Alan Hodgkin, who used the squid giant axon as an experimental model for the study of the nervous system. The relatively large size of the neurons allowed the use of finely-tipped electrodes to monitor the electrophysiological changes that fluctuate across the membrane. In 1941 Katz's implementation of microelectrodes in the gastrocnemius sciatic nerve of frogs' legs illuminated the field. It soon became generalized that the end-plate potential (EPP) alone is what triggers the muscle action potential, which is manifested through contractions of the frog legs.

One of Katz's seminal findings, in studies carried out with Paul Fatt in 1951, was that spontaneous changes in the potential of muscle-cell membrane occur even without the stimulation of the presynaptic motor neuron. These spikes in potential are similar to action potentials except that they are much smaller, typically less than 1 mV; they were thus called miniature end plate potentials (MEPPs). In 1954, the introduction of the first electron microscopic images of postsynaptic terminals revealed that these MEPPs were created by synaptic vesicles carrying neurotransmitters. The sporadic nature of the release of quantal amounts of neurotransmitter led to the "vesicle hypothesis" of Katz and del Castillo, which attributes quantization of transmitter release to its association with synaptic vesicles. This also indicated to Katz that action potential generation can be triggered by the summation of these individual units, each equivalent to an MEPP.

== Types ==
Examples of spatial summation of signals on a neuron

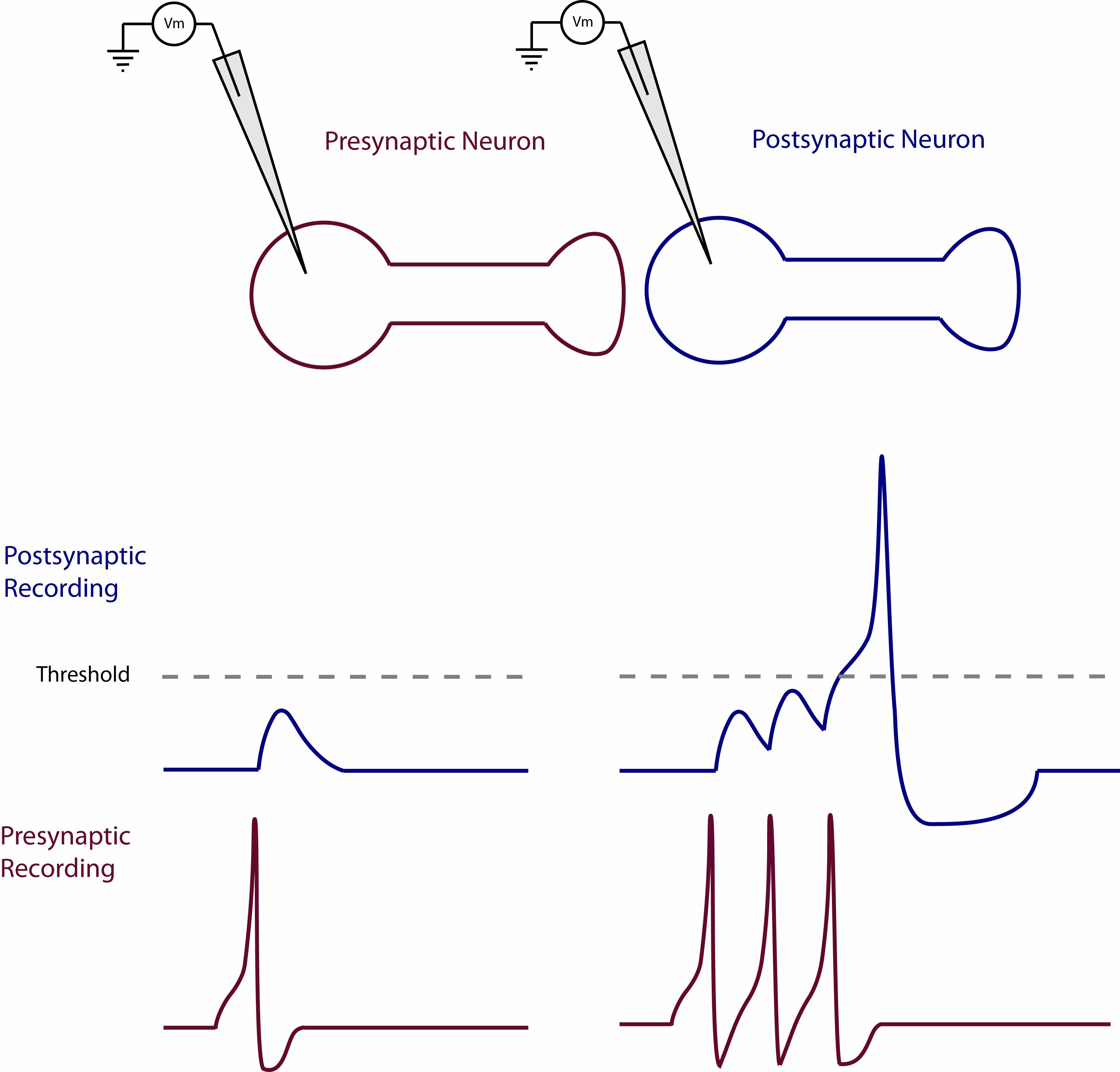
A diagram of temporal summation

At any given moment, a neuron may receive postsynaptic potentials from thousands of other neurons. Whether threshold is reached, and an action potential generated, depends upon the spatial (i.e. from multiple neurons) and temporal (from a single neuron) summation of all inputs at that moment. It is traditionally thought that the closer a synapse is to the neuron's cell body, the greater its influence on the final summation. This is because postsynaptic potentials travel through dendrites which contain a low concentration of voltage-gated ion channels. Therefore, the postsynaptic potential attenuates by the time it reaches the neuron cell body. The neuron cell body acts as a computer by integrating (adding or summing up) the incoming potentials. The net potential is then transmitted to the axon hillock, where the action potential is initiated. Another factor that should be considered is the summation of excitatory and inhibitory synaptic inputs. The spatial summation of an inhibitory input will nullify an excitatory input. This widely observed effect is called inhibitory 'shunting' of EPSPs.

=== Spatial summation ===
Spatial summation is a mechanism of eliciting an action potential in a neuron with input from multiple presynaptic cells.It involves the integration of local current spreads across the dendritic surfaces. Unlike simple algebraic addition, this process is often non-linear due to the presence of active dendritic conductances and shunting inhibition, which is explained later in the article. Summation of excitatory postsynaptic potentials increases the probability that the potential will reach the threshold potential and generate an action potential, whereas summation of inhibitory postsynaptic potentials can prevent the cell from achieving an action potential. The closer the dendritic input is to the axon hillock, the more the potential will influence the probability of the firing of an action potential in the postsynaptic cell.

=== Temporal summation ===
Temporal summation occurs when a high frequency of action potentials in the presynaptic neuron elicits postsynaptic potentials that summate with each other. The duration of a postsynaptic potential is longer than the interval between incoming action potentials. If the time constant of the cell membrane is sufficiently long, as is the case for the cell body, then the amount of summation is increased. The amplitude of one postsynaptic potential at the time point when the next one begins will algebraically summate with it, generating a larger potential than the individual potentials. This allows the membrane potential to reach the threshold to generate an action potential.

==== Integration vs. Coincidence Detection ====
Temporal summation sort of runs on a spectrum, between coincidence detection and integration over time. Neurons can act more like one or the other depending on how they are set up. Coincidence detectors fire only if multiple inputs hit fast, in quick succession. Their membrane time constants, stays short, so it does not let signals linger. Integrators are the opposite, with a long time constant. They accumulate postsynaptic potentials gradually, over longer periods of time, which allows for summing weaker signals that arrive spaced out. Sometimes it gets a bit fuzzy where exactly the switch happens along that continuum.

== Mechanism ==
Summation basically works through changes in the membrane conductance (g), and the currents (I), that flow through ligand gated and voltage gated ion channels. When neurotransmitters reach the postsynaptic receptors, they alter the membrane permeability to ions like sodium, potassium, or chloride. This shifts the membrane potential (Vm) closer to the equilibrium potential for whichever ions are involved. Also, summation is not a purely linear addition; it is modulated by the dendritic membrane's time constant and length constant, which determine how far and how long a local potential remains influential before decaying.

=== Glutamate as an excitatory example ===
The neurotransmitter glutamate, for example, is predominantly known to trigger excitatory postsynaptic potentials (EPSPs) in vertebrates. Experimental manipulation can cause the release of the glutamate through the non-tetanic stimulation of a presynaptic neuron. Glutamate then binds to AMPA receptors contained in the postsynaptic membrane causing the influx of positively charged sodium atoms. While a single depolarization of this kind may not have much of an effect on the postsynaptic neuron, repeated depolarizations caused by high frequency stimulation can lead to EPSP summation and to surpassing the threshold potential.

=== GABA as an inhibitory example ===
In contrast to glutamate, the neurotransmitter GABA mainly functions to trigger inhibitory postsynaptic potentials (IPSPs) in vertebrates. The binding of GABA to a postsynaptic receptor causes the opening of ion channels that either cause an influx of negatively charged chloride ions into the cell or an efflux of positively charged potassium ions out of the cell. The effect of these two options is the hyperpolarization of the postsynaptic cell, or IPSP. Summation with other IPSPs and contrasting EPSPs determines whether the postsynaptic potential will reach threshold and cause an action potential to fire in the postsynaptic neuron.

=== EPSP and depolarization ===
As long as the membrane potential is below threshold for firing impulses, the membrane potential can summate inputs. That is, if the neurotransmitter at one synapse causes a small depolarization, a simultaneous release of transmitter at another synapse located elsewhere on the same cell body will summate to cause a larger depolarization. This is called spatial summation and is complemented by temporal summation, wherein successive releases of transmitter from one synapse will cause progressive polarization change as long as the presynaptic changes occur faster than the decay rate of the membrane potential changes in the postsynaptic neuron. Neurotransmitter effects last several times longer than presynaptic impulses, and thereby allow summation of effect. Thus, the EPSP differs from action potentials in a fundamental way: it summates inputs and expresses a graded response, as opposed to the all-or-none response of impulse discharge.

=== IPSP and hyperpolarization ===
At the same time that a given postsynaptic neuron is receiving and summating excitatory neurotransmitter, it may also be receiving conflicting messages that are telling it to shut down firing. These inhibitory influences (IPSPs) are mediated by inhibitory neurotransmitter systems that cause postsynaptic membranes to hyperpolarize. Such effects are generally attributed to the opening of selective ion channels that allow either intracellular potassium to leave the postsynaptic cell or to allow extracellular chloride to enter. In either case, the net effect is to add to the intracellular negativity and move the membrane potential farther away from the threshold for generating impulses.

=== Ionic Modulation of Summation ===
According to newer sources, the way summation works is that it's controlled by the voltage-gated currents in the dendritic membrane. The A-type potassium currents (I_{KA}) reduce current magnitudes by making the membrane time constants shorter as well as promote coincidence detection by filtering out inputs that are too slow or not timed right. On the other hand, the T-type calcium currents (I_{CaT}) and the transient sodium currents (I_{NaT}) do the opposite. They amplify currents, lengthening the time constant and facilitate the integration of sparse or lower-frequency signals.

=== Two-Stage Integration Model ===
Recent studies also suggests that neurons use a two-stage model to integrate signals. Each dendritic branch acts as a separate/independent computational subunit in the first stage. It takes local inputs and sums them up, but nonlinearly i.e. not just straight-up addition. These branches can produce spikes on their own, which are mediated by Na+, Ca2+, or NMDA receptors. Then, in the second stage, all those outputs from the branches are summated globally at the soma, which figures out the overall signal leading to the axonal output.

=== Post-synaptic Potentials and Algebraic processing ===
When EPSPs and IPSPs are generated simultaneously in the same cell, the output response will be determined by the relative strengths of the excitatory and inhibitory inputs. Output instructions are thus determined by this algebraic processing of information. Because the discharge threshold across a synapse is a function of the presynaptic volleys that act upon it, and because a given neuron may receive branches from many axons, the passage of impulses in a network of such synapses can be highly varied. The versatility of the synapse arises from its ability to modify information by algebraically summing input signals. The subsequent change in stimulation threshold of the postsynaptic membrane can be enhanced or inhibited, depending on the transmitter chemical involved and the ion permeabilities. Thus the synapse acts as a decision point at which information converges, and it is modified by algebraic processing of EPSPs and IPSPs. In addition to the IPSP inhibitory mechanism, there is a presynaptic kind of inhibition that involves either a hyperpolarization on the inhibited axon or a persistent depolarization; whether it is the former or the latter depends on the specific neurons involved.

== Current research ==
Research nowadays often looks at summation in the brain by running computer simulations or recording from live animals. They try to set up high conductance states that feel more like what happens naturally in the brain. When it comes to theta oscillations, studies point out that in conditions closer to real life, the slow inactivation of those ionic currents does not play as big a role as people used to believe. This makes it easier for neurons to flip between different ways of coding information, rate based where they integrate signals over time, or more temporal where coincidence detection is involved. This switch depends on how fast the background oscillations are. This part stands out because it shows flexibility in how neurons work.

The microelectrodes used by Katz and his contemporaries pale in comparison to the technologically advanced recording techniques available today. Spatial summation began to receive a lot of research attention when techniques were developed that allowed the simultaneous recording of multiple loci on a dendritic tree. A lot of experiments involve the use of sensory neurons, especially optical neurons, because they are constantly incorporating a ranging frequency of both inhibitory and excitatory inputs. Modern studies of neural summation focus on the attenuation of postsynaptic potentials on the dendrites and the cell body of a neuron. These interactions are said to be nonlinear, because the response is less than the sum of the individual responses. Sometimes this can be due to a phenomenon caused by inhibition called shunting, which is the decreased conductance of excitatory postsynaptic potentials.

Shunting inhibition is exhibited in the work of Michael Ariel and Naoki Kogo, who experimented with whole cell recording on the turtle basal optic nucleus. Their work showed that spatial summation of excitatory and inhibitory postsynaptic potentials caused attenuation of the excitatory response during the inhibitory response most of the time. They also noted a temporary augmentation of the excitatory response occurring after the attenuation. As a control they tested for attenuation when voltage-sensitive channels were activated by a hyperpolarization current. They concluded that attenuation is not caused by hyperpolarization but by an opening of synaptic receptor channels causing conductance variations.

=== Potential therapeutic applications ===
According to recent meta-analyses, Temporal Summation of Pain (TSP) is now used as a dynamic quantitative sensory test to predict clinical consequences in chronic pain patients. Moreover, multimodal analysis (EEG/fMRI) is used to map these summations across entire functional networks.

Regarding nociceptive stimulation, spatial summation is the ability to integrate painful input from large areas while temporal summation refers to the ability of integrating repetitive nociceptive stimuli. Widespread and long lasting pain are characteristics of many chronic pain syndromes. This suggests that both spatial and temporal summations are important in chronic pain conditions. Indeed, through pressure stimulation experiments, it has been shown that spatial summation facilitates temporal summation of nociceptive inputs, specifically pressure pain. Therefore, targeting both spatial and temporal summation mechanisms simultaneously can benefit treatment of chronic pain conditions.

== See also ==
- Shunting
- Length constant
- Long-Term Potentiation
- Neurotransmission
