= Itch =

Uncomfortable skin sensation

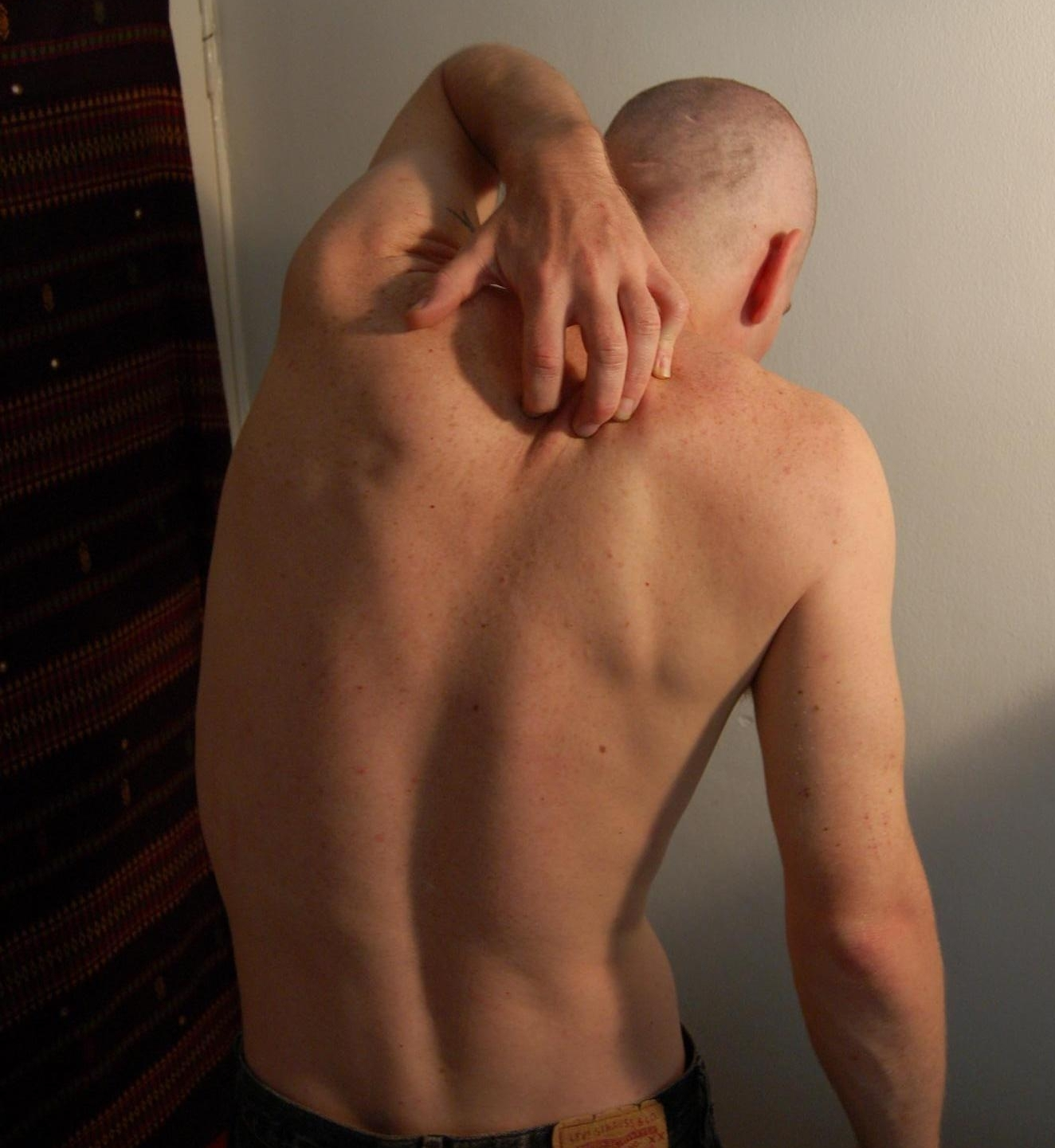
- A man scratching his back
- Specialty: Dermatology
- Symptoms: Compulsion to scratch an irritated area of skin
- Causes: Certain infections, allergies (from rashes, welts or hives), blood derangements and environmental factors
- Risk factors: Dry skin
- Diagnostic method: Often based on the causes of itching
- Differential diagnosis: Pain
- Treatment: Antipruritics, phototherapy

An itch (also known as pruritus) is a sensation that causes a strong desire or reflex to scratch. Itches have many similarities to pain, and while both are unpleasant sensory experiences, their behavioral response patterns are different. Pain creates a withdrawal reflex, whereas itches lead to a scratch reflex.

Unmyelinated nerve fibers for itches and pain both originate in the skin. Information for them is conveyed centrally in two distinct systems that both use the same nerve bundle and spinothalamic tract.

== Classification ==
Most commonly, an itch is felt in one place. If it is felt all over the body, then it is called generalized itch or generalized pruritus. Generalized itch is infrequently a symptom of a serious underlying condition, such as cholestatic liver disease.

If the sensation of itching persists for six weeks or longer, then it is called chronic itch or chronic pruritus. Chronic idiopathic pruritus or chronic pruritus of unknown origin is a form of itch that persists for longer than six weeks, and for which no clear cause can be identified.

== Signs and symptoms ==
Pain and itch have different mechanisms of onset and different behavioral responses. Pain elicits a withdrawal reflex, which leads to retraction, and therefore a reaction trying to protect an endangered part of the body. By contrast, an itch creates a scratch reflex, which draws one to the affected skin site. Itch generates stimulus of a foreign object underneath or upon the skin, and also the urge to remove it. For example, responding to a local itch sensation is an effective way to remove insects from one's skin.

Scratching has traditionally been regarded as a way to relieve oneself by reducing the annoying itch sensation. However, there are hedonic aspects to scratching, as one would find noxious scratching highly pleasurable. This can be problematic with chronic itch patients, such as ones with atopic dermatitis, who may scratch affected spots until they no longer produce a pleasant or painful sensation, instead of when the itch sensation disappears. These aspects might contribute to the compulsive nature of itch and scratching.

=== Contagious itch ===
Events of "contagious itch" are common occurrences and may be more than a localized phenomenon in the place one scratches.

=== Itches due to specific stimuli ===
In polycythemia vera itching is particularly caused by skin contact with warm water, such as in bath or shower.

=== Itch inhibition due to pain ===
Studies done in the last decade have shown that itch can be inhibited by many other forms of painful stimuli, such as noxious heat, physical rubbing or scratching, noxious chemicals, and electric shock.

== Causes ==
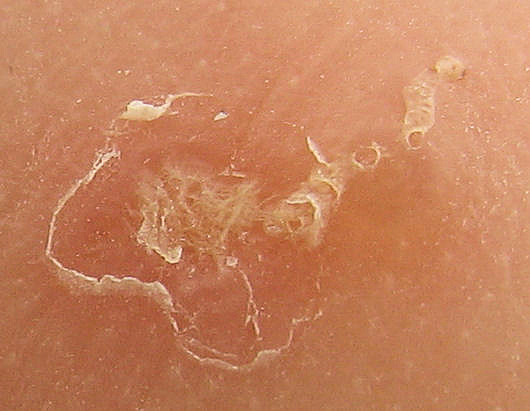
Scabies is one cause of itching

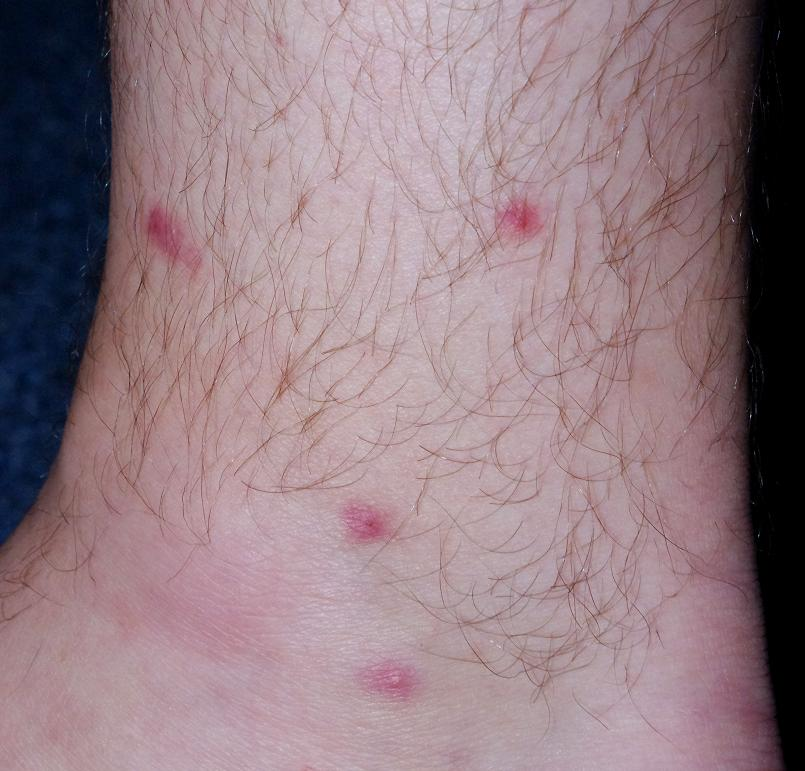
Swimmer's itch

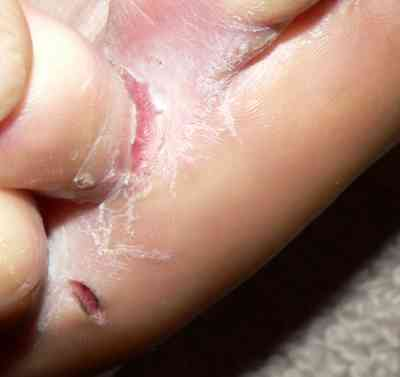
Athlete's foot (showing the toes from below plus the front part of the sole)

=== Infectious ===
- Body louse, found in substandard living conditions
- Bed bug, lives in mattresses and bedding. May crawl into cracks, baseboards.
- Cutaneous larva migrans, a skin disease caused by hookworm infection
- Head lice, if limited to the neck and scalp
- Herpes, a viral disease
- Arthropod bites, such as those from mosquitos or chiggers
- Pubic lice, if limited to the genital area
- Scabies, especially when several other persons in close contact also itch
- Shaving, which may irritate the skin
- Swimmer's itch, a short-term immune reaction
- Varicella – i.e. chickenpox, prevalent among young children and highly contagious
- Tungiasis, ectoparasite of skin

=== Environmental and allergic ===
- Allergic reaction to contact with specific chemicals, such as urushiol, derived from poison ivy or poison oak, or Balsam of Peru, found in many foods and fragrances. Certain allergens may be diagnosed in a patch test.
- Foreign objects on the skin are the most common cause of non-pathological itching.
- Photodermatitis – sunlight reacts with chemicals in the skin, leading to the formation of irritant metabolites.
- Urticaria (also called hives) usually causes itching.

=== Skin ===
- Dandruff, an unusually large amount of flaking is associated with this sensation.
- Punctate palmoplantar keratoderma, a group of disorders characterized by abnormal thickening of the palms and soles.
- Skin conditions (such as psoriasis, eczema, seborrhoeic dermatitis, sunburn, athlete's foot, and hidradenitis suppurativa). Most are of an inflammatory nature.
- Scab healing, scar growth, and the development or emergence of moles, pimples, and ingrown hairs from below the epidermis.
- Xerosis, dry skin, frequently seen in the winter and also associated with older age, frequent bathing in hot showers or baths, and high-temperature and low-humidity environments.

=== Other diseases ===
- Diabetes mellitus, a group of metabolic diseases in which a person has high blood sugar
- Hyperparathyroidism, overactivity of the parathyroid glands resulting in excess production of parathyroid hormone (PTH)
- Iron deficiency anemia, a common anemia (low red blood cell or hemoglobin levels)
- Cholestasis, where bile acids leaking into the serum activate peripheral opioid receptors, resulting in the characteristic generalized, severe itching
- Malignancy or internal cancer, such as lymphoma or Hodgkin's disease
- Polycythemia, which can cause generalized itching due to increased histamines. In polycythemia vera itching is particularly caused by skin contact with warm water, such as in bath or shower.
- Psychiatric disease ("psychogenic itch", as may be seen in delusional parasitosis)
- Thyroid illness
- Uraemia – the itching sensation this causes is known as uremic pruritus
- mast cell activation syndrome (MCAS).
- fibromyalgia

=== Medication ===
- Drugs (such as opioids) that activate histamine (H1) receptors or trigger histamine release
- Chloroquine, a drug used in the treatment and prevention of malaria
- Bile acid congeners such as obeticholic acid

=== Related to pregnancy ===
- Gestational pemphigoid, a dermatosis of pregnancy
- Intrahepatic cholestasis of pregnancy, a medical condition in which cholestasis occurs
- Pruritic urticarial papules and plaques of pregnancy (PUPPP), a chronic hives-like rash

=== Other ===
- Menopause, or changes in hormonal balances associated with aging
- Terminal illness

== Mechanism ==
Itch can originate in the peripheral nervous system (dermal or neuropathic) or in the central nervous system (neuropathic, neurogenic, or psychogenic).

=== Pruritoceptive ===
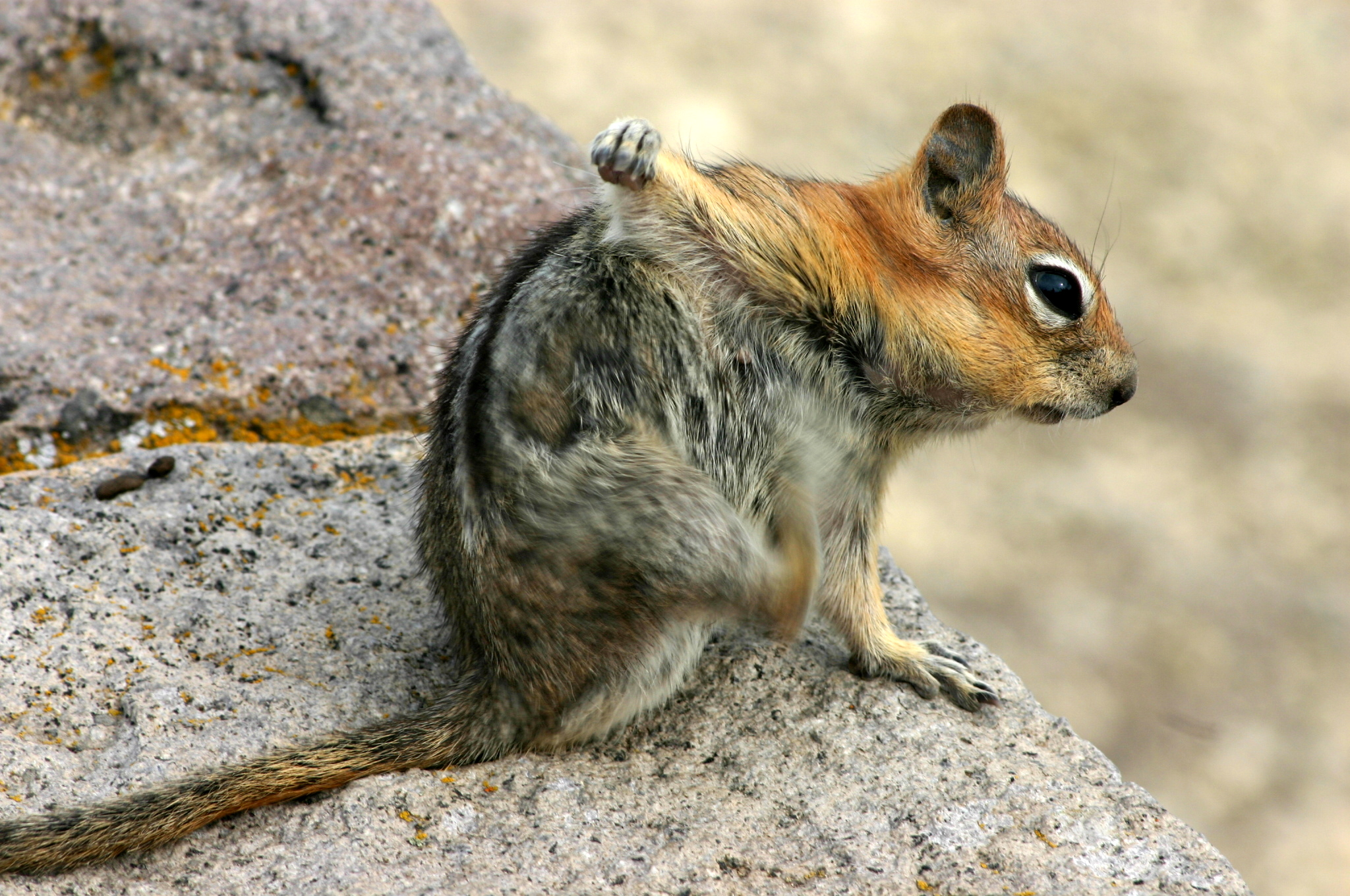
A ground squirrel scratching itself

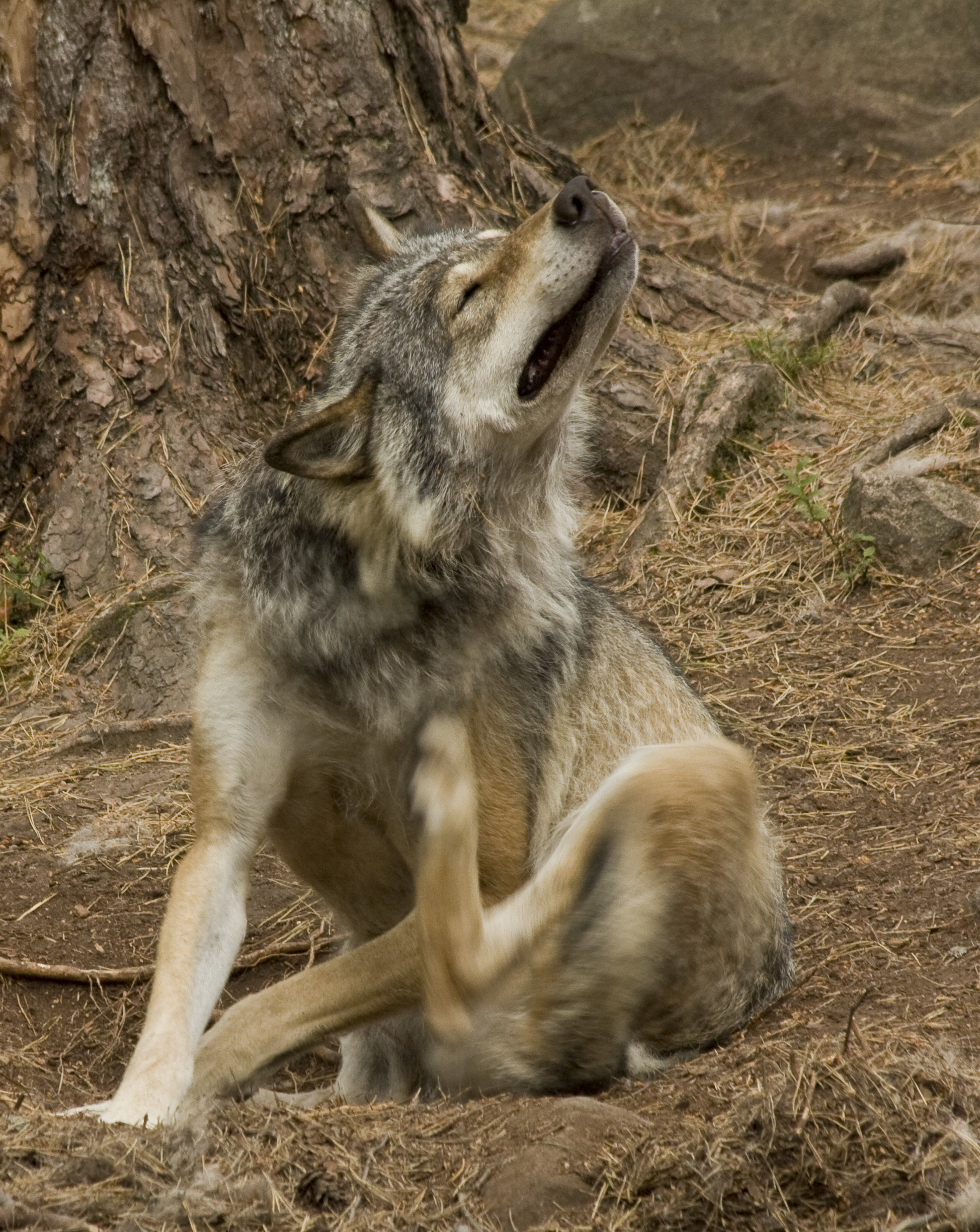
A wolf scratching itself

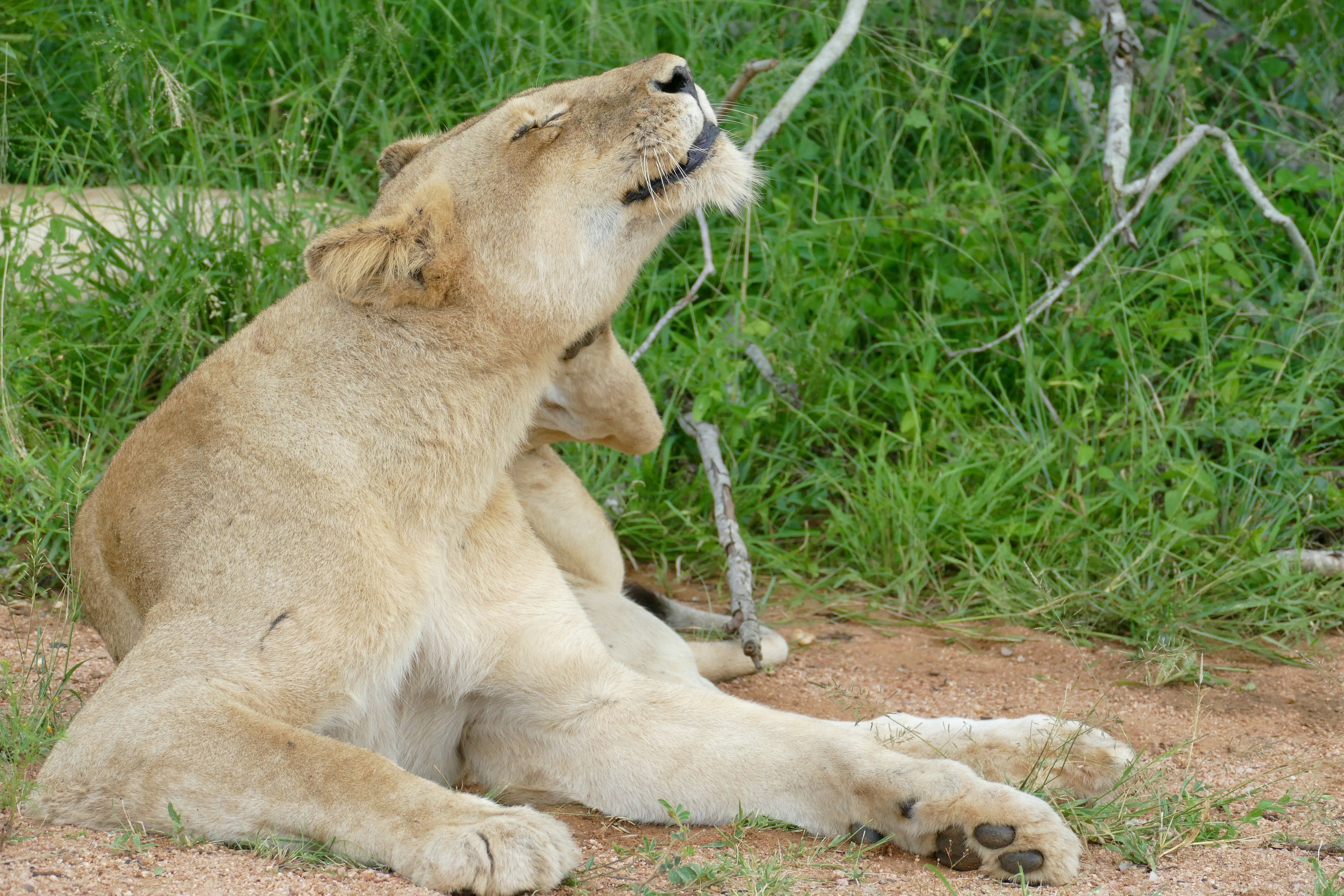
A lioness scratching herself

Itch originating in the skin is known as pruritoceptive, and can be induced by a variety of stimuli, including mechanical, chemical, thermal, and electrical stimulation, or infection. The primary afferent neurons responsible for histamine-induced itch are unmyelinated C-fibres.

Nociceptors. Two major classes of human C-fibre nociceptors exist: mechano-responsive nociceptors and mechano-insensitive nociceptors. Mechano-responsive nociceptors have been shown in studies to respond to mostly pain, and mechano-insensitive receptors respond mostly to itch induced by histamine. However, it does not explain mechanically induced itch or itch produced without a flare reaction that involves no histamine. Therefore, it is possible that pruritoceptive nerve fibres have different classes of fibres, which is unclear in current research.

Histology and skin layers. Sensitivity to pruritic stimuli is evenly distributed across the skin and has a clear spot distribution with similar density to that of pain. The different substances that elicit itch upon intracutaneous injection (injection within the skin) elicit only pain when injected subcutaneously (beneath the skin).

=== Molecular basis ===
Itch is often classified as that which is histamine mediated (histaminergic) and nonhistaminergic.

Itch is readily abolished in skin areas treated with nociceptor excitotoxin capsaicin but remains unchanged in skin areas rendered touch insensitive by pretreatment with anti-inflammatory saponins. Although experimentally induced itch can still be perceived under a complete A-fiber conduction block, it is significantly diminished. Overall, itch sensation is mediated by A-delta and C nociceptors located in the uppermost layer of the skin.

Gene expression. Using single-cell mRNA sequencing, clusters of genes expressed in itch-related tissues were identified, e.g. NP1-3, transmitting itch information; where NP3 expresses neuropeptides Nppb and Sst as well as genes involved in inflammatory itch (Il31ra, Osmr and Crystrl2). The histamine receptor gene Hrh1 was found in NP2 and NP3, suggesting that histaminergic itch is transmitted by both these pruriceptive sub clusters.

Infection. Staphylococcus aureus, a bacterial pathogen associated with itchy skin diseases, directly activates pruriceptor sensory neurons to drive itch. Skin exposure to S. aureus causes robust itch and scratch-induced damage.

=== Spinal itch pathway ===
After the pruriceptive primary afferent has been activated, the signal is transmitted from the skin into the spinal dorsal horn. In this area, a number of interneurons will either be inhibited or activated to promote activation of projection neurons, mediating the pruriceptive signal to the brain. The GRP-GRPR interneuron system has been found to be important for mediating both histaminergic and non-histaminergic itch, where the GRP neurons activate GRPR neurons to promote itch.

=== Neuropathic ===
Neuropathic itch can originate at any point along the afferent pathway as a result of damage of the nervous system. They could include diseases or disorders in the central nervous system or peripheral nervous system. Examples of neuropathic itch in origin are notalgia paresthetica, brachioradial pruritus, brain tumors, multiple sclerosis, peripheral neuropathy, and nerve irritation.

=== Neurogenic ===
Neurogenic itch, which is itch induced centrally but with no neural damage, is mostly associated with increased accumulation of exogenous opioids and possibly synthetic opioids.

=== Psychogenic ===
Itch is also associated with some symptoms of psychiatric disorders such as tactile hallucinations, delusions of parasitosis, or obsessive-compulsive disorders (as in OCD-related neurotic scratching).

=== Peripheral sensitization ===
Inflammatory mediators—such as bradykinin, serotonin (5-HT) and prostaglandins—released during a painful or pruritic inflammatory condition not only activate pruriceptors but also cause acute sensitization of the nociceptors. In addition, expression of neuro growth factors (NGF) can cause structural changes in nociceptors, such as sprouting. NGF is high in injured or inflamed tissue. Increased NGF is also found in atopic dermatitis, a hereditary and non-contagious skin disease with chronic inflammation. NGF is known to up-regulate neuropeptides, especially substance P. Substance P has been found to have an important role in inducing pain; however, there is no confirmation that substance P directly causes acute sensitization. Instead, substance P may contribute to itch by increasing neuronal sensitization and may affect release of mast cells, which contain many granules rich in histamine, during long-term interaction.

=== Central sensitization ===
Noxious input to the spinal cord is known to produce central sensitization, which consists of allodynia, exaggeration of pain, and punctuate hyperalgesia, extreme sensitivity to pain. Two types of mechanical hyperalgesia can occur: 1) touch that is normally painless in the uninjured surroundings of a cut or tear can trigger painful sensations (touch-evoked hyperalgesia), and 2) a slightly painful pin prick stimulation is perceived as more painful around a focused area of inflammation (punctuate hyperalgesia). Touch-evoked hyperalgesia requires continuous firing of primary afferent nociceptors, and punctuate hyperalgesia does not require continuous firing which means it can persist for hours after a trauma and can be stronger than normally experienced. In addition, it was found that patients with neuropathic pain, histamine ionophoresis resulted in a sensation of burning pain rather than itch, which would be induced in normal healthy patients. This shows that there is spinal hypersensitivity to C-fiber input in chronic pain.

== Treatment ==
A variety of over-the-counter and prescription anti-itch drugs are available. Some plant products have been found to be effective anti-pruritics, others not. Non-chemical remedies include cooling, warming, soft stimulation.

Topical antipruritics in the form of creams and sprays are often available over-the-counter. Oral anti-itch drugs also exist and are usually prescription drugs. The active ingredients usually belong to the following classes:

- Antihistamines, such as diphenhydramine (Benadryl)
- Corticosteroids, such as hydrocortisone topical cream
- Counterirritants, such as mint oil, menthol, or camphor
- Crotamiton (trade name Eurax) is an antipruritic agent available as a cream or lotion, often used to treat scabies. Its mechanism of action remains unknown.
- JAK inhibitors, such as ruxolitinib topical cream
- Local anesthetics, such as benzocaine topical cream (Lanacane)

Phototherapy is helpful for severe itching, especially if caused by chronic kidney disease. The common type of light used is UVB.

Sometimes scratching relieves isolated itches, hence the existence of devices such as the back scratcher. Often, however, scratching only offers temporary relief and can intensify itching, even causing further damage to the skin, dubbed the "itch-scratch cycle".

The mainstay of therapy for dry skin is maintaining adequate skin moisture and topical emollients.

No studies have been conducted to investigate the effectiveness of emollient creams, cooling lotions, topical corticosteroids, topical antidepressants, systemic antihistamines, systemic antidepressants, systemic anticonvulsants, and phototherapy on chronic pruritus of unknown origin. However, there are clinical trials currently underway with dupilumab which is thought to alleviate itch by acting on the IL-4 receptor on sensory neurons. The effectiveness of therapeutic options for people who are terminally ill with malignant cancer is not known.

== Epidemiology ==
Approximately 280 million people globally, 4% of the population, have difficulty with itchiness. This is comparable to the 2–3% of the population who have psoriasis.

== History ==
In 1660, German physician Samuel Hafenreffer introduced the definition of pruritus (itch).

== See also ==
- Feeling, a perceptual state of conscious experience.
- Formication, a sensation that resembles that of small insects crawling on or under the skin
- Pruritus ani (also known as anusitis), irritation of skin at the exit of the rectum (anus), causing the desire to scratch
- Referred itch, a phenomenon in which a stimulus applied in one region of the body is felt as an itch or irritation in a different part of the body
- Itching powder, a powder or powder-like substance that induces itching when applied onto human skin.
