= Length constant =

Constant describing the distance a membrane potential passively travels along a neuron

In neurobiology, the length constant (λ) is a mathematical constant used to quantify the distance that a graded electric potential will travel along a neurite via passive electrical conduction. The greater the value of the length constant, the further the potential will travel. A large length constant can contribute to spatial summation—the electrical addition of one potential with potentials from adjacent areas of the cell.

The length constant can be defined as:

$$\lambda = \sqrt{\frac{r_m}{r_i + r_o}}$$

where r_{m} is the membrane resistance (the force that impedes the flow of electric current from the outside of the membrane to the inside, and vice versa), r_{i} is the axial resistance (the force that impedes current flow through the axoplasm, parallel to the membrane), and r_{o} is the extracellular resistance (the force that impedes current flow through the extracellular fluid, parallel to the membrane). In calculation, the effects of r_{o} are negligible, so the equation is typically expressed as:

$$\lambda = \sqrt {\frac{r_m}{r_i}}$$

The membrane resistance is a function of the number of open ion channels, and the axial resistance is generally a function of the diameter of the axon. The greater the number of open channels, the lower the r_{m}. The greater the diameter of the axon, the lower the r_{i}.

The length constant is used to describe the rise of potential difference across the membrane

$$V(x) = V_{\max} \left(1 - e^{-x /\lambda}\right)$$

The fall of voltage can be expressed as:

$$V(x) = V_{\max} e^{-x /\lambda}$$

Where voltage, V, is measured in millivolts, x is distance from the start of the potential (in millimeters), and λ is the length constant (in millimeters).

V_{max} is defined as the maximum voltage attained in the action potential, where:

$$V_{\max} = r_m I$$

where r_{m} is the resistance across the membrane and I is the current flow.

Setting for x = λ for the rise of voltage sets V(x) equal to .63 V_{max}. This means that the length constant is the distance at which 63% of V_{max} has been reached during the rise of voltage.

Setting for x = λ for the fall of voltage sets V(x) equal to .37 V_{max}, meaning that the length constant is the distance at which 37% of V_{max} has been reached during the fall of voltage.

== By resistivity ==
Expressed with resistivity rather than resistance, the constant λ is (with negligible r_{o}):

$$\lambda = \sqrt{\frac {r \rho_m} {2 \rho_i}}$$

Where $r$ is the radius of the axon.

The radius and number 2 come from these equations:

- $r_m = \frac{\rho_m}{2\pi r}$
- $r_i = \frac{\rho_i}{\pi r^2}$

Expressed in this way, it can be seen that the length constant increases with increasing radius of the neuron.

== See also ==
- Isopotential muscle
- Time constant
