= Pramocaine =

Chemical compound

Clinical data
- Trade names: Analpram HC, Caladryl, Caladryl Clear, Cortane-B, Epifoam, Gold Bond Maximum Relief, Itch-X, Pramosone, Prax, Proctodan-HC, Proctofoam, Tronolane, Vagisil Medicated
- AHFS/Drugs.com: International Drug Names
- MedlinePlus: a682429
- License data: US DailyMed: 8bfeea34-25d5-4721-a17f-d9f1d0084cc3, 81ab7fa7-d9b0-49dc-9782-02f37e588c5e
- Routes of administration: Topical, rectal, Vaginal
- ATC code: D04AB07 (WHO) C05AD07 (WHO)

Legal status
- Legal status: Depends on country, some formulations OTC others Rx only

Identifiers
- IUPAC name: 4-[3-(4-Butoxyphenoxy)propyl]morpholine
- CAS Number: 140-65-8; hydrochloride: 637-58-1
- PubChem CID: 4886
- DrugBank: DB09345
- ChemSpider: 4717
- UNII: 068X84E056; hydrochloride: 88AYB867L5
- KEGG: D08407
- ChEBI: CHEBI:8357
- ChEMBL: ChEMBL1198
- CompTox Dashboard (EPA): DTXSID8040692
- ECHA InfoCard: 100.004.933

Chemical and physical data
- Formula: C_{17}H_{27}NO_{3}
- Molar mass: 293.407 g·mol^{−1}
- 3D model (JSmol): Interactive image
- SMILES: O(c2ccc(OCCCN1CCOCC1)cc2)CCCC
- InChI: InChI=1S/C17H27NO3/c1-2-3-12-20-16-5-7-17(8-6-16)21-13-4-9-18-10-14-19-15-11-18/h5-8H,2-4,9-15H2,1H3; Key:DQKXQSGTHWVTAD-UHFFFAOYSA-N

Pramocaine (INN and BAN, also known as pramoxine or pramoxine HCl) is a topical anesthetic discovered at Abbott Laboratories in 1953 and used as an antipruritic. During research and development, pramocaine hydrochloride stood out among a series of alkoxy aryl alkamine ethers as an especially good topical local anesthetic agent. Pharmacologic study revealed it to be potent and of low acute and subacute toxicity, well tolerated by most mucous membranes and of a low sensitizing index in humans. Like other local anesthetics, pramocaine decreases the permeability of neuronal membranes to sodium ions, blocking both initiation and conduction of nerve impulses. Depolarization and repolarization of excitable neural membranes is thus inhibited, leading to numbness. Notably, pramocaine is chemically distinct from other local anesthetics, being neither an amino amide nor an amino ester.

== Use ==
Topical anesthetics are used to relieve pain and itching caused by conditions such as sunburn or other minor burns, insect bites or stings, poison ivy, poison oak, poison sumac, and minor cuts and scratches. The hydrochloride salt form of pramocaine is water-soluble.

Pramocaine is a common component of over the counter hemorrhoid preparations.

Pramocaine is also included in some topical antibiotics like Neosporin Plus Pain Relief used to treat or prevent infections due to its pain relieving effects. However, there is no additional antibiotic effect compared to antibiotics without pramocaine.

== Synthesis ==
Patent: Sino:

The ether formation between hydroquinone (1) and 1-bromobutane (2) gives 4-butoxyphenol [122-94-1] (3). Alkylation with 4-(3-chloropropyl)morpholine [57616-74-7] (4) gives pramocaine (5).

== See also ==
- Local anesthesia
