= Isopotential muscle =

Muscle fibers which are fewer than two times the length constant

Isopotential muscle refers to muscle fibers which are fewer than two times the length constant.
