= Shunting (neurophysiology) =

Neuron event

Shunting is an event in the neuron which occurs when an excitatory postsynaptic potential and an inhibitory postsynaptic potential are occurring close to each other on a dendrite, or are both on the soma of the cell.

According to temporal summation one would expect the inhibitory and excitatory currents to be summed linearly to describe the resulting current entering the cell. However, when inhibitory and excitatory currents are on the soma of the cell, the inhibitory current causes the cell resistance to change (making the cell "leakier"), thereby "shunting" instead of eliminating the effects of the excitatory input.

== See also ==
- Spatial summation
- Temporal summation
