= Trigger zone =

In neuroscience and neurology, a trigger zone is an area in the body, or of a cell, in which a specific type of stimulation triggers a specific type of response.

The term was first used in this context around 1914 by Hugh T. Patrick, who was writing about trigeminal neuralgia, a condition in which pain fibers in the trigeminal nerve become hypersensitive. In people with trigeminal neuralgia, even a light touch to some part of the body—often a tooth or a part of the face—can give rise to an extended period of excruciating pain. Patrick referred to the sensitive part of the body as the "dolorogenic zone", and used the term "trigger zone" as a simpler equivalent. Through the 1920s and 1930s the term came into steadily wider use, but almost always in the context of neuralgia.

Starting in the late 1930s, other types of stimulation and other types of responses were characterized as having the properties of a trigger zone. In 1940, for example, Morison and Dempsey observed that a small area of the cerebral cortex could be triggered when electrical stimulation would evoke widespread activity in other parts of the cerebral cortex. In 1944 Paul Wilcox described triggering of epileptic seizure by electrical stimulation of another area of the cerebral cortex.

The chemoreceptor trigger zone is within the area postrema of the medulla oblongata in which many types of chemical stimulation can provoke nausea and vomiting. This area was first identified and named in 1951 by Herbert L. Borison and Kenneth R. Brizzee.

Parts of cells, rather than parts of the body, can also behave as trigger zones. The axon hillock of a neuron possesses the highest density of voltage-gated Na^{+} channels, and is therefore the region where it is easiest for the action potential threshold to be reached.
