= Shunt =

Shunt may refer to:

- Shunt (medical), a hole or passage allowing fluid to move from one part of the body to another
- Shunt (electrical), a device allowing electric current to pass around a point in a circuit
- Shunt, a British term for rear-end collision of road vehicles
- Shunt (railway operations), sorting items of rolling stock into trains, also called "switching"
- Shunt (sailing), a maneuver for sailing upwind on reversible single-outrigger boats
- Shunt (theatre company), an experimental theatre company based in London
- Shunt, an alternative metabolic pathway
- Shunt, a house robot in the TV series Robot Wars
