= Samuel Hafenreffer =

German physician (1587–1660)

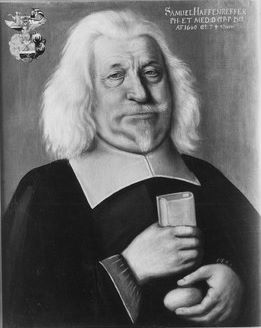
Samuel Hafenreffer

Samuel Hafenreffer (26 April 1587 – 26 September 1660) was a German physician, who in 1660 introduced the definition of pruritus. Pruritus is the "unpleasant sensation" the body produces that provokes a person to scratch themselves. Hafenreffer is also credited as being the author of the first textbook in German speaking countries on the subject of dermatology.
