= Brachioradial pruritus =

Intense itching of the arm

Brachioradial pruritus (sometimes abbreviated BRP) is an intense itching sensation of the arm usually between the wrist and elbow of either or both arms. The itch can be so intense that affected individuals will scratch their own skin to a bleeding condition.

The condition is becoming increasingly common, presenting in patients who are usually fair skinned and middle aged and participate in golf, tennis, outdoor table tennis, sailing, or other leisure outdoor activities in sunny climates.

No cure has been found, but depending on severity, good control with treatment can be achieved. The application of ice packs to the affected area can also diminish the itch short-term.

== Causes ==
The cause is not known, although there are a few lines of thought on what causes it.

BRP is an enigmatic condition with a controversial cause; some authors consider BRP to be a photodermatosis, whereas other authors attribute BRP to compression of cervical nerve roots. BRP may be attributed to a neuropathy, such as chronic cervical radiculopathy. The possibility of an underlying neuropathy should be considered in the evaluation and treatment of all patients with BRP.

The main cause of BRP is not known, but there is evidence to suggest that BRP may arise in the nervous system. Cervical spine disease may also be an important contributing factor.

Patients with BRP may have underlying cervical spine pathology. Whether this association is causal or coincidental remains to be determined. There is controversy regarding the cause of brachioradial pruritus: is it caused by a nerve compression in the cervical spine or is it caused by a prolonged exposure to sunlight? In many patients, itching of the arms or shoulders is seasonal. Some patients reported neck pain.

BRP can be linked to the thyroid.

== Diagnosis ==
Brachioradial pruritus (BRP) is a localized pruritus (itching) of the dorsolateral side of the arm.

== Treatments ==
An icepack directly onto the skin provides instant relief.

For milder cases, the intense itch/scratch cycle can be broken by applying a topical skin coolant gel containing menthol, camphor, or other topical coolant to affected itchy areas, and then consistently applying 100+SPF sunscreen to affected skin of arms, shoulders, neck, etc., whenever they are expected to be exposed to the sun. A topical prescription consisting of a unique combination of ketamine 0.5% and amitriptyline hydrochloride 1% has shown immediate and long term relief with no serious adverse events in at least one severe case.

Many different medications and types of topical creams have been experimented with, but few seem to make any difference, except for the above.

Symptom management may include the application of a unique prescription topical combination of ketamine .5% and amitriptyline hydrochloride 1%.

Milder cases may use lidocaine or capsaicin, and/or cervical traction.

Treatment with lamotrigine has been reported. Treatment by acupuncture has been reported.

Treatment with Gabapentin has been reported.

Treatment with Aloe Vera lotion has been reported.

== See also ==
- List of cutaneous conditions
