= Charles Reynolds =

Charles Reynolds may refer to:

- Charles Reynolds (cleric) (c. 1496–1535), Irish cleric from county Leitrim opposed to Henry VIII of England
- Charles Reynolds (legislator) (1839–1914), soldier and politician
- Jasper Reynolds (Charles Reynolds, 1873–?), English footballer for Wolverhampton Wanderers
- Charles Reynolds (magician) (1932–2010), inventor of illusions
- Charles Reynolds (sailor) (born 1943), British Olympic soling sailor
- Charles A. Reynolds (1848–1936), civil engineer and politician
- C. B. Reynolds (Charles B. Reynolds, 1846–1915), member of the Washington State House of Representatives
- Charles F. Reynolds III, American geriatric psychiatrist
- Charles H. Reynolds (1924-1996), justice of the Kentucky Supreme Court
- Charlie Reynolds (catcher) (1865–1944), Major League Baseball catcher who played in 1889
- Charlie Reynolds (pitcher) (1857–1913), Major League Baseball pitcher who played in 1882
- Charlie Reynolds (politician) (born 1971), member of the West Virginia House of Delegates
- Charley Reynolds (1842–1876), U.S. Army scout killed at the Battle of Little Bighorn
- Chuck Reynolds (born 1946), American football player
- Pete Reynolds (Charles Reynolds, 1885–1951), American college football coach

== See also ==
- Charles B. Reynolds Round Barn, a historic building in Lyon County, Iowa
