= Charlie Reynolds =

Charlie Reynolds may refer to:

- Charlie Reynolds (pitcher), Major League Baseball pitcher, played 1882
- Charlie Reynolds (catcher), Major League Baseball catcher, who played in 1889
- Charlie Reynolds (politician), member of the West Virginia House of Delegates in 2021

== See also ==
- Charles Reynolds (disambiguation)
