= Charles F. Reynolds III =

American geriatric psychiatrist

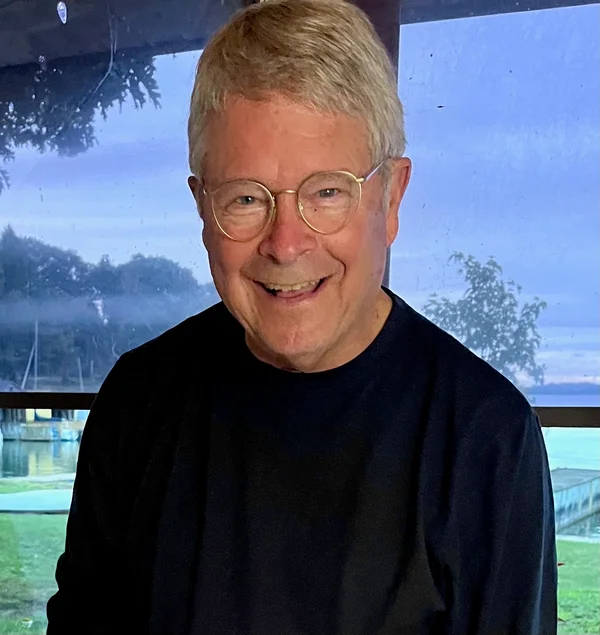
- Education: University of Virginia , Yale University
- Known for: treatment of depression in older adults, suicide prevention, and the development of models of mental-health care for aging populations
- Awards: Julius Axelrod Mentorship Award, American College of Neuropsychopharmacology (2022)
- Scientific career
- Fields: Psychiatrist clinical scientist
- Workplaces: University of Pittsburgh School of Medicine

Charles F. Reynolds III is an American psychiatrist and clinical scientist known for his research in geriatric psychiatry, late-life depression, prolonged grief disorder, and sleep disorders.

His work has focused on the prevention and treatment of depression in older adults, suicide prevention, and the development of models of mental-health care for aging populations.

He is the emeritus UPMC Endowed Professor in Geriatric Psychiatry at the University of Pittsburgh School of Medicine and Professor of Behavioral and Community Health Sciences at the University of Pittsburgh Graduate School of Public Health. He has also served as director of the Aging Institute of UPMC and the University of Pittsburgh and has directed the John A. Hartford Center of Excellence in Geriatric Psychiatry.

== Early life and education ==
Reynolds grew up in Virginia and in the Mississippi Delta, where his early life coincided with the civil-rights struggles of the 1960s.

He studied philosophy and religious studies at the University of Virginia, graduating with high honors in 1969. He later earned a Doctor of Medicine (M.D.) from Yale University in 1973, where his thesis examined the effects of lithium carbonate on electroencephalographic sleep measures in bipolar disorder.

After graduating, he trained in internal medicine at McGill University before completing a psychiatry residency at the University of Pittsburgh, where he worked with psychiatrists including David Kupfer and Thomas Detre.

== Academic and clinical career ==
Reynolds joined the University of Pittsburgh faculty in 1977 following his residency and remained there for four decades. During this period he collaborated with researchers in mood disorders and geriatric psychiatry while building a research program focused on depression in older adults.

His work has been supported by numerous grants from the National Institute of Mental Health (NIMH) and other organizations. He received multiple career development awards, including K-series awards and a MERIT award supporting long-term clinical trials on maintenance treatment for depression in older adults.

In addition to his research activities, Reynolds has served as editor-in-chief of the American Journal of Geriatric Psychiatry and previously served on editorial boards for journals including American Journal of Psychiatry, Archives of General Psychiatry, and JAMA Psychiatry.

He also served as president of the American Association for Geriatric Psychiatry, the American Foundation for Suicide Prevention, and the American College of Psychiatrists. In addition, he has contributed at the national level as a member of the National Institute of Mental Health National Advisory Council, as chair of the DSM 5 Sleep Wake Disorders Committee, and as a member of advisory panels at the National Academy of Medicine, addressing the nation’s eldercare workforce, sleep disorders, mental health, aging, and suicide prevention.

== Research ==
Reynolds’ research has addressed areas in geriatric mental health, particularly the prevention and treatment of late-life depression and the role of sleep disturbances in mood disorders. His early work examined electroencephalographic sleep patterns as indicators of brain function in aging, depression, and dementia.

Over time his research expanded into intervention science and large-scale clinical trials aimed at improving outcomes for older adults with depression, including treatment-resistant depression.

His research includes understanding biological and psychosocial factors influencing treatment response in late-life depression.

Reynolds and collaborators have also investigated strategies for treatment-resistant depression in older adults, including augmentation approaches and personalized care models informed by neurocognitive and medical factors.

== Honors ==
- Research Mentor Award, American Psychiatric Association (2011)
- Herbert Pardes Humanitarian Prize in Mental Health, Brain and Behavior Research Foundation (2016)
- Donald Klein Lifetime Achievement Award, American Society of Clinical Psychopharmacology (2022)
- Julius Axelrod Mentorship Award, American College of Neuropsychopharmacology (2022)
- Elected to the Association of American Physicians (2017).

== Selected publications ==
- Reynolds, Charles F. (2006-06-08). "Maintenance Treatment of Depression in Old Age". New England Journal of Medicine. 354 (23): 2505–2506. doi:10.1056/nejmc061020. ISSN 0028-4793.
- Reynolds III, Charles F.; Frank, Ellen; Perel, James M.; Imber, Stanley D.; Cornes, Cleon; Miller, Mark D.; Mazumdar, Sati; Houck, Patricia R.; Dew, Mary Amanda; Stack, Jacqueline A.; Pollock, Bruce G.; Kupfer, David J. (1999-01-06). "Nortriptyline and Interpersonal Psychotherapy as Maintenance Therapies for Recurrent Major Depression". JAMA. 281 (1): 39. doi:10.1001/jama.281.1.39. ISSN 0098-7484.
- Lavretsky, Helen; Lenze, Eric; Karp, Jordan; Reynolds, Charles (2022). "Augmenting Vs. Switching Antidepressant for Treatment Resistant Depression in Older adults: Results from the Optimum Study". The American Journal of Geriatric Psychiatry. 30 (4): S6–S7. doi:10.1016/j.jagp.2022.01.260. ISSN 1064-7481.
- Herrman, Helen; Patel, Vikram; Kieling, Christian; Berk, Michael; Buchweitz, Claudia; Cuijpers, Pim; Furukawa, Toshiaki A; Kessler, Ronald C; Kohrt, Brandon A; Maj, Mario; McGorry, Patrick; Reynolds, Charles F; Weissman, Myrna M; Chibanda, Dixon; Dowrick, Christopher (2022). "Time for united action on depression: a Lancet–World Psychiatric Association Commission". The Lancet. 399 (10328): 957–1022. doi:10.1016/s0140-6736(21)02141-3. hdl:10183/245491. ISSN 0140-6736.
