= Sharlene Santana =

Venezuelan-American biologist

Sharlene E. Santana
- Education: Universidad de Los Andes, University of Massachusetts Amherst
- Known for: Ecological and Morphological Assessment of Chiropteran Species
- Scientific career
- Fields: Evolution and systematics, biomechanics, behavioral studies, ecology, phylogenetics
- Workplaces: University of California Los Angeles, University of Washington, Burke Museum of Natural History and Culture
- Doctoral advisor: Elizabeth Dumont

Sharlene E. Santana is a Venezuelan–American biologist, currently serving as the Curator of Mammals at the Burke Museum of Natural History and as a professor of Evolutionary biology at the University of Washington, in Seattle, Washington. Her research primarily focuses on the order Chiroptera (bats), and her work often engages with a diverse range of biological disciplines, including evolution, systematics, biomechanics, behavioral studies, and ecology. Santana has worked to expand opportunities for underrepresented minorities in STEM fields and has relied on innovative applications of technology to increase the amount of high-quality scientific information that is available to the general public.

== Early life ==
Santana was born in Venezuela and was raised with her mother in the city of Maturín after her parents divorced during her early childhood. Santana credits her rich upbringing in Venezuela, a tropical country with abundant floral and faunal diversity, as one of the catalysts that inspired her to pursue biological research. Supportive middle school and high school educators additionally helped spark her curiosity in science and expand her knowledge of biology. During her youth, Santana spent long hours outside, observing the local environment. Her mother, a self-employed pharmacist and businesswoman, further provided Santana with the opportunity to learn chemistry and engage with scientific concepts from an early age.

== Education ==
=== Undergraduate education ===
Santana received her bachelor's degree in Biology at the Universidad de Los Andes (University of the Andes) in Mérida, Venezuela in 2004. When she began her university studies, she initially intended to pursue a concentration in molecular biology; however, her career interests changed as she attended undergraduate classes, and Santana eventually developed an affinity for environmental field work and behavioral studies, which led her to her to choose fruit bats as the topic of her undergraduate thesis.

During her final year at the Universidad de Los Andes, Santana completed her undergraduate thesis under the guidance of Jesús Molinari, a professor specializing in animal biology. The work that she performed during the development of her thesis helped to further solidify her interests in research and provided her with her first opportunity to engage in her own independent scientific investigation.

=== Graduate education ===
After the completion of her bachelor's degree, Santana received her Ph.D. in Organismic and Evolutionary Biology at the University of Massachusetts Amherst in 2010. Studying in the United States as a foreign-born student presented Santana with obstacles such as applying for a student visa and taking the Test of English as a Foreign Language, in addition to the mandatory Graduate Record Examination required by the university. During her graduate education, Santana was advised by Elizabeth Dumont, whose research focused on understanding mammal evolution through the lenses of behavior, morphology, and ecology.

Santana's doctoral dissertation was titled "The Evolution Of Cranial Morphology, Feeding Performance And Behavior In Neotropical Leaf-Nosed Bats (Chiroptera: Phyllostomidae)". This research focused on how the cranial anatomy of Neotropical Leaf-Nosed Bats affects their feeding behavior, as well as how various feeding morphologies develop over evolutionary time.

== Career and research ==
=== Post-doctoral appointment ===
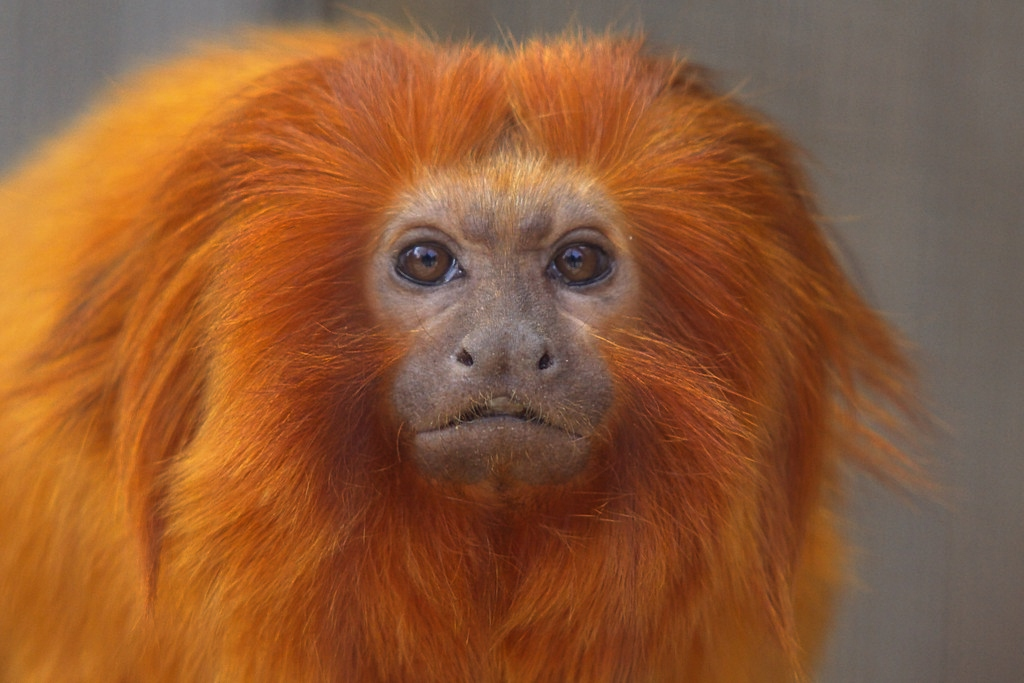
The Golden lion tamarin (Leontopithecus rosalia) is one of the many primates that was analyzed in Santana's facial coloring research.

The deteriorating economic and political climate of Venezuela compelled Santana to seek out postdoctoral opportunities in the United States, despite an initial desire to pursue a research career in Venezuela. Santana received a two-year postdoctoral fellowship with Michael Alfaro, an evolutionary biologist from the Institute for Society and Genetics at the University of California, Los Angeles. During her time as a postdoctoral fellow, Santana continued to publish research on bat morphology and feeding behavior, in addition to new research on the evolutionary significance of facial coloring and markings in primates.

Santana's research on facial coloring in primates demonstrated that facial coloring is correlated with the size of the social groups that primates live in. In particular, Santana and her associates found that neotropical primates living in smaller social groupings tend to have more complex facial coloring and patterning. Santana's research has been praised for its innovative use of existing data, as much of the data used for her studies in primates was gathered from previously published images of primate facial features, taking advantage of databases such as ARKive, InfoNatura, and All the World's Primates.

=== University of Washington ===
In 2012, Santana moved to Seattle after receiving a position as an assistant professor in the Department of Biology at the University of Washington, in Seattle, Washington. In the same year, Santana became the Curator of Mammals at the Burke Museum of Natural History and Culture, which is also affiliated with the University of Washington. In 2017, after five years at the University of Washington, Santana secured status as an associate professor with tenure, and in 2021, Santana was promoted to a full Professor. Santana teaches numerous courses at the university, including BIOL 439: Functional Morphology and BIOL 448: Mammalogy, in addition to facilitating undergraduate research and independent study opportunities for graduate students.

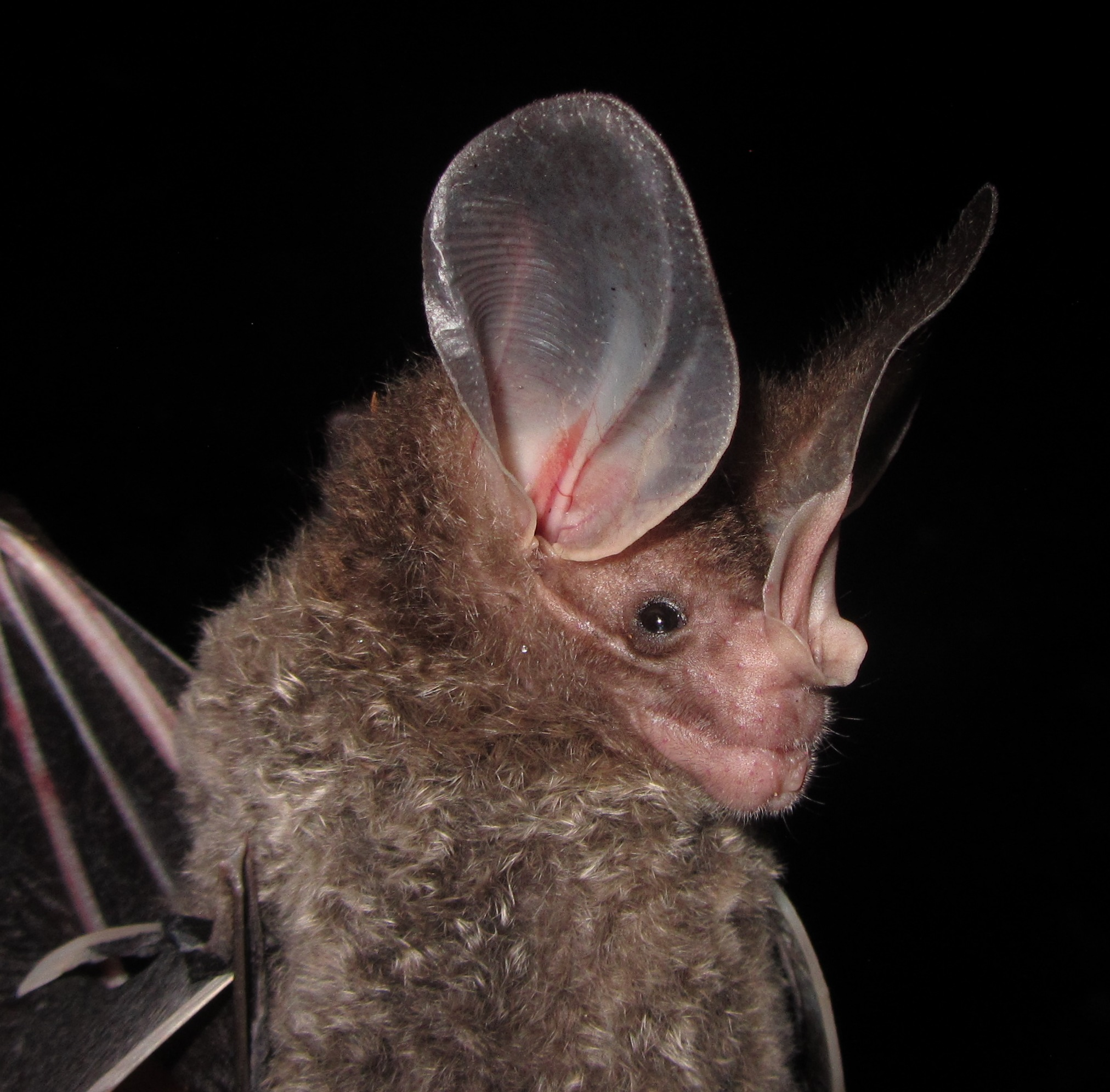
A Big-eared woolly bat (Chrotopterus auritus), one of the many species of carnivorous bats studied by Santana.

Santana serves as the Principal investigator of the "Santana Lab", where she supervises a team consisting of Burke Museum collections staff, postdoctoral researchers, doctoral (PhD) students, and a number of undergraduate students. The Santana Lab primarily investigates Chiropterans, with a focus on cataloging morphological diversity and understanding the macroevolutionary processes that allowed for the development of the wide variety of bats seen in modern times.

Santana's research on carnivorous bat species has received considerable media attention. For the first time in biological history, a 2016 study completed by Santana and undergraduate researcher Elena Cheung demonstrated that bat species which independently adopt a carnivorous lifestyle share morphological and anatomical commonalities, including larger overall skull sizes and a high bite force, despite their broad gape distances. This research has helped to fill a gap in scientific literature and has influenced biologists' understanding of the evolution of specialized carnivory.

Santana has traveled widely to pursue her research interests and she has conducted investigations in many countries, including Panama, Grenada, Costa Rica. Santana became a Fulbright Scholar in November 2019, and through the Fulbright Program, she received a grant to complete research in association with the University of Costa Rica, in a project titled "Ecological and Evolutionary Dynamics Between Fruiting Plants and Frugivores".

Santana is a member of the Society for Integrative and Comparative Biology where she serves on the Integrative and Comparative Biology Editorial Board. In addition, she is a member of the North American Society for Bat Research (NASBR), where she has served as the Awards Chair on the NASBR Board of Directors.

=== Burke Museum of Natural History and Culture ===
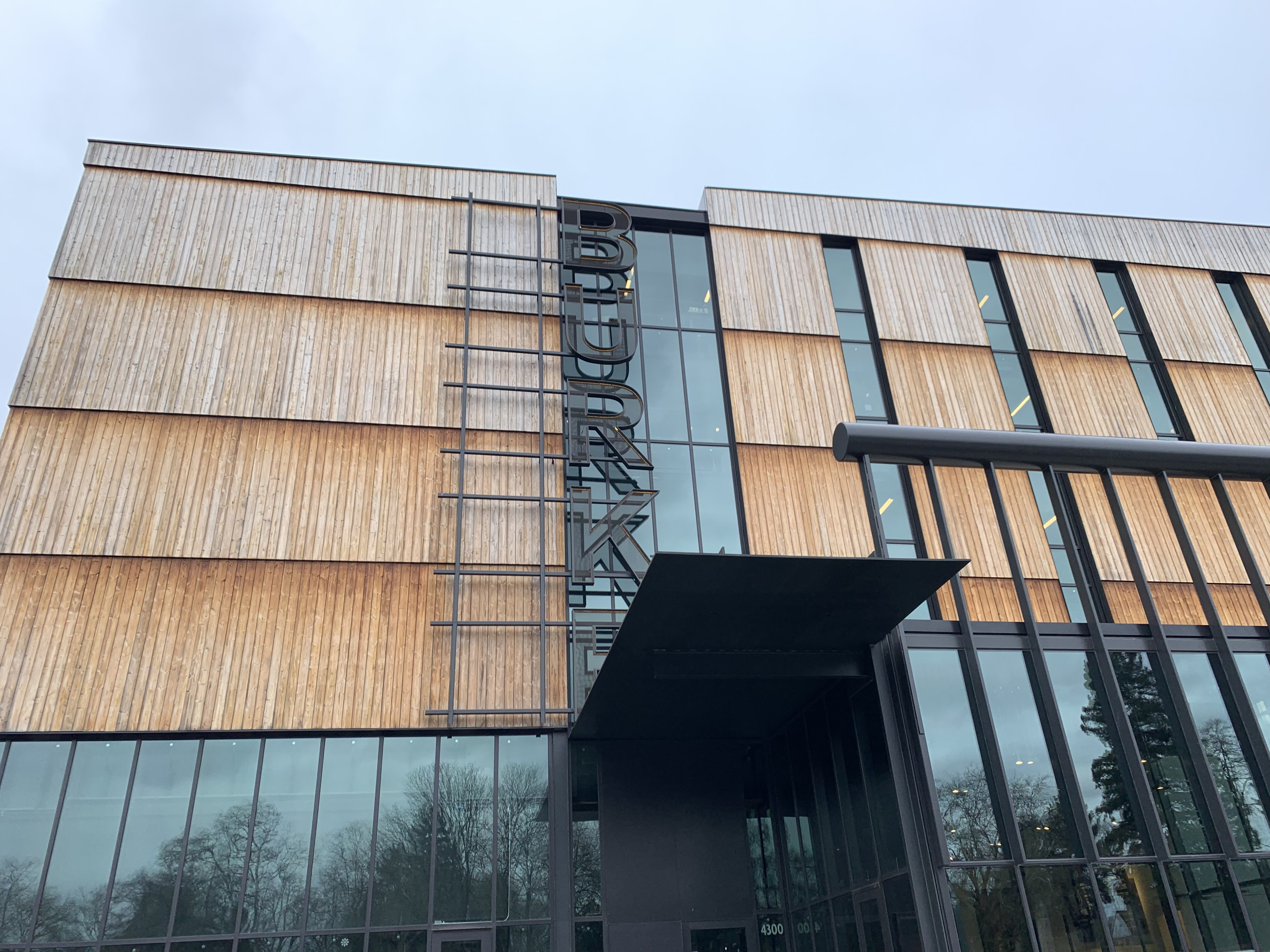
The main entrance to the Burke Museum of Natural History in Seattle, Washington, which houses a Mammalogy collection curated by Santana that contains over 55,000 specimens.

As a curator, Santana has led efforts to increase the accessibility of the Burke Museum's specimen collections. In 2017, Santana, along with Luke Tornabene, Adam Summers, and Katherine Maslenikov, helped the museum to join openVertebrate, a large-scale collaborative digitization project led by the Florida Museum of Natural History at the University of Florida. The openVertebrate project received $2.5 million from the National Science Foundation to help the museums of 18 academic institutions to upload 3D computerized tomography (CT) scans of vertebrate species onto MorphoSource, a publicly accessible database of biological and cultural data. Collectively, the openVertebrate team plans to publish high-resolution scans of more than 20,000 individual vertebrate specimens, which would allow their collection to showcase more than 25% of known vertebrate species and over 80% of known vertebrate genera.

== Outreach and activism ==
Santana has worked to increase opportunities for underrepresented minorities in STEM fields, with a particular focus on Native American students. In 2016, Santana and professor Paul Gignac of Oklahoma State University received a $15,000 grant, which was used to help Native American students attend the 2016 Annual Meeting of the Society for Integrative and Comparative Biology. Santana hopes to draw Native American students into STEM careers by increasing students' exposure to scientific research conferences and providing opportunities to attend professional events.

As a graduate student, Santana served on the Organismic and Evolutionary Biology Outreach Committee at the University of Massachusetts Amherst, where she worked to increase the accessibility of science by providing informational resources, events, and workshops to the public. As a professor, Santana has served on the Broadening Participation Committee of the Society for Integrative and Comparative Biology, as well as the Diversity, Equity, and Inclusion Committee of the North American Society for Bat Research.

The Santana Lab has also produced "Pocket Bats", a digital application that allows members of the public to access a database of micro Computerized Tomography (microCT) scans using virtual reality software. Users can view realistic, textured models of bat skulls using "Augment", a real-time 3D modeling application that is freely available on both iOS/iPadOS and Android devices.

== Recognition, awards, and honors ==
Numerous organizations have recognized Santana's scientific contributions, including One Million Women in STEM, a nonprofit aimed at tracking and highlighting the contributions that women have made to scientific disciplines. Santana has also been quoted in the New York Times and her work has been featured on NBC News and in Smithsonian Magazine. She has led seminars at a wide range of universities and academic institutions, including Harvard University, Texas A&M University, the University of Michigan, and Northern Arizona University.

Santana has received numerous professional accolades, including the Carl Gans Award (2016), and the Dwight D. Davis Award (2010, Honorable Mention), and the University of Massachusetts Organismic and Evolutionary Biology Teaching Award (2008).

== Select publications ==
- Arbour, JH; Curtis, AA; Santana, SE (2019). "Signatures of echolocation and dietary ecology in the adaptive evolution of skull shape in bats". Nature Communications. 10 (1): 2036. Bibcode:2019NatCo..10.2036A. doi:10.1038/s41467-019-09951-y. PMC 6497661. PMID 31048713.
- Arbour, JH; Santana, SE (2017). "A major shift in diversification rate helps explain macroevolutionary patterns in primate species diversity". Evolution. 71 (6): 1600–1613. doi:10.1111/evo.13237. PMID 28346661. S2CID 21070077 – via Wiley Online Library.
- Santana, SE; Alfaro, JL; Noonan, A; Alfaro, ME (2013). "Adaptive response to sociality and ecology drives the diversification of facial colour patterns in catarrhines". Nature Communications. 4 (2765): 2765. Bibcode:2013NatCo...4.2765S. doi:10.1038/ncomms3765. PMID 24212362. S2CID 205321093.
- Dumont, ER; Dávalos, LM; Goldberg, A; Santana, SE; Rex, K; Voigt, CC (2011). "Morphological innovation, diversification and invasion of a new adaptive zone". Proceedings of the Royal Society B: Biological Sciences. 279 (1734): 1797–1805. doi:10.1098/rspb.2011.2005. PMC 3297451. PMID 22113035.
- Santana, SE; Dumont, ER; Davis, JL (2010). "Mechanics of bite force production and its relationship to diet in bats". Functional Ecology. 24 (4): 776–784. doi:10.1111/j.1365-2435.2010.01703.x – via Wiley Online Library.
- Davis, JL; Santana, SE; Dumont, ER; Grosse, IR (2010). "Predicting bite force in mammals: two-dimensional versus three-dimensional lever models". Journal of Experimental Biology. 213 (11): 1844–1851. doi:10.1242/jeb.041129. PMID 20472771. S2CID 1452036.
