= Augment =

Augment or augmentation may refer to:

== Language ==
- Augment (Indo-European), a syllable added to the beginning of the word in certain Indo-European languages
- Augment (Bantu languages), a morpheme that is prefixed to the noun class prefix of nouns in certain Bantu languages
- Augment, a name sometimes given to the verbal ō- prefix in Nahuatl grammar

== Technology ==
- Augmentation (obstetrics), the process by which the first and/or second stages of an already established labour is accelerated or potentiated by deliberate and artificial means
- Augmentation (pharmacology), the combination of two or more drugs to achieve better treatment results
- Augmented reality, a live view of a physical, real-world environment whose elements are augmented by computer-generated sensory input
- Augmented cognition, a research field that aims at creating revolutionary human-computer interactions
- Augment (Tymshare), a hypertext system derived from Douglas Engelbart's oN-Line System, renamed "Augment" by Tymshare
- Augment (app), augmented reality software
- Data augmentation, technique to generate extra data for machine learning

== Art ==
- Augmentation (heraldry), heraldic modifications
- Augmentation (music), the musical technique of lengthening or widening of rhythm or interval
- Augment (album), an album by Erra

== Mathematics ==
- Augmented matrix, in mathematics, a matrix formed by placing two other matrices side-by-side
- Augmentation (geometry), a way of enlarging a polyhedron
- Augmentation (algebra), a certain algebra homomorphism
- Augmentation ideal, in mathematics, an ideal in a group ring

== Medicine ==
- Breast augmentation, the breast implant and fat-graft mammoplasty procedures for correcting or enhancing breasts
- Synaptic augmentation, a form of short term synaptic plasticity

== In fiction ==
- Nanobiotechnology augmentations, a feature in the computer game Deus Ex and Deus Ex: Invisible War
- Prosthetic augmentations, a key feature in the computer game Deus Ex: Human Revolution and Deus Ex: Mankind Divided
- Augments (Star Trek), genetically enhanced humans, in the Star Trek franchise
- Transhumans in David Brin's post-apocalyptic novel The Postman

== Other ==
- Human enhancement
