= Ivonne Jiménez Velázquez =

Puerto Rican geriatrician and internist

- Born: San Juan, Puerto Rico, U.S.
- Education: University of Puerto Rico School of Medicine (MD)
- Scientific career
- Fields: Geriatrics, internal medicine
- Workplaces: University of Puerto Rico School of Medicine

Ivonne Z. Jiménez Velázquez is a Puerto Rican geriatrician and internist. She is a professor and chair of the department of medicine at University of Puerto Rico School of Medicine.

== Early life and education ==
Jiménez Velázquez was born in San Juan, Puerto Rico. She completed a bachelor's degree, magna cum laude, at University of Puerto Rico in 1978. She earned a medical degree from University of Puerto Rico School of Medicine in 1982. She interned at Hospital Regional de Caguas and for 3 years in internal medicine at Hospital Universitario where she later became an instructor in the department of medicine. Jiménez Velázquez specialized in geriatrics at Mount Sinai Hospital until 1989.

== Career ==
Jiménez Velázquez worked as an adjunct professor at Mount Sinai before returning to the department of medicine at University of Puerto Rico School of Medicine where she became a full professor in 2002. She is chair of the department of medicine. She is a member of the American Geriatrics Society, Association of Professors of Medicine, and American Association for Geriatric Psychiatry.

== Awards and honors ==
Jiménez Velázquez is a fellow of the American College of Physicians.
