= Pre-Bötzinger complex =

Cluster of interneurons in the medulla oblongata

PreBötzinger complex

Details
- System: Respiratory system
- Location: brainstem
- Function: generation of respiratory rhythm

Identifiers
- NeuroLex ID: nlx_152600

The preBötzinger complex, often abbreviated as preBötC, is a functionally and anatomically specialized site in the ventral-lateral region of the lower medulla oblongata (i.e., lower brainstem). The preBötC is part of the ventral respiratory group of respiratory related interneurons. Its foremost function is to generate the inspiratory breathing rhythm in mammals. In addition, the preBötC is widely and paucisynaptically connected to higher brain centers that regulate arousal and excitability more generally such that respiratory brain function is intimately connected with many other rhythmic and cognitive functions of the brain and central nervous system. Further, the preBötC receives mechanical sensory information from the airways that encode lung volume as well as pH, oxygen, and carbon dioxide content of circulating blood and the cerebrospinal fluid.

The preBötC is approximately colocated with the hypoglossal (XII) cranial motor nucleus as well as the 'loop' portion of the inferior olive in the anterior-posterior axis. The caudal border of the preBötC is slightly caudal to the obex, where the brainstem merges with the cervical spinal cord.

== Discovery ==
The initial description of the preBötC was widely disseminated in a 1991 paper in Science, but its discovery predates that paper by one year. The team was led by Jack L. Feldman and Jeffrey C. Smith at the University of California, Los Angeles (UCLA), but the Science paper also included UCLA coauthor Howard Ellenberger, as well as Klaus Ballanyi and Diethelm W. Richter from Göttingen University in Germany. The region derives its name from a neighboring medullary region involved in expiratory breathing rhythm dubbed Bötzinger complex, which was named after the Silvaner (Bötzinger) variety of wine, featured at the conference at which that region was named (click here to hear a BBC interview with Jack Feldman on the topic of Bötzinger / preBötzinger nomenclature).

== Functional definition of the preBötC ==
The first definition of the preBötC was based largely on functional criteria. If the central neuraxis from pons to lumbar spinal cord is removed from a newborn rodent, then basic neural motor patterns can be generated and recorded using microelectrodes in vitro. The breathing rhythm emerges spontaneously with robust and continuous motor activity measurable on any cranial or spinal motor nerve that innervates breathing related musculature.

By isolating a rhythmically active newborn rat brainstem-spinal cord in a microsectioning vibratome, Smith and colleagues performed a series of 75 μm-thick transverse sections while monitoring inspiratory-related motor rhythms. The preBötC represented the portion of the ventral-lateral lower brainstem that was necessary and sufficient to generate inspiratory related rhythm and motor output in vitro. Surprisingly, if microsections were applied from the anterior and posterior regions of the neuraxis simultaneously, a transverse section of thickness ~500 μm – which retained the preBötC and XII motoneurons – generated a rhythm and motor pattern that was almost identical to the rhythm and pattern in the full brainstem-spinal cord preparation. Perturbations that elevated excitability in preBötC sped up respiratory rhythm, whereas perturbations that depressed its excitability slowed the rhythm down. The authors concluded that these preBötC-retaining slice preparations preserved the core network generating inspiratory rhythm as well as premotor and motor neurons that define a minimal breathing-related circuit suitable for studies under controlled conditions in vitro. Breathing slices became a widely exploited preparation for such studies that continue to be used by laboratories worldwide to the present day.

== Anatomic definition of the preBötC ==
Anatomical observations advanced understanding of the preBötC by providing specific markers expressed by its constituent neurons, which helped understand its approximate borders. The superset of markers is based largely on neuropeptides and peptide receptors, whose expression patterns have come to define the borders of preBötC and its constituent rhythm-generating and output pattern-related interneurons . preBötC neurons selectively express neurokinin-1 receptors (NK1Rs), μ-opioid receptors (μORs), as well as somatostatin (SST) and SST2a-type receptors. Of course, selectively does not mean exclusively or entirely. Each marker has limitations as a defining feature of the preBötC core, but generally speaking, the neuropeptide-related markers below have proved to be both reliable and of great utility in the quest to define preBötC structure and function.

Peptide markers have been used to probe preBötC function. Substance P (SP) accelerated inspiratory rhythms in vitro by depolarizing putatively rhythmogenic preBötC neurons. SP also depolarized preBötC neurons whose function is premotor-related, i.e., those neurons transmit the nascent inspiratory rhythm to motoneurons outside the preBötC. The net result was that SP sped up the rhythm and elevated the baseline level neural activity in XII nerve recordings in vitro.

The expression of NK1Rs by preBötC neurons was used to test its inspiratory rhythm-generating, role. SP, conjugated to the ribosomal toxin saporin, was injected into the preBötC of adult rats. Over the course of a week, this intervention caused progressive breathing deficits that ultimately resulted in severely pathological (i.e., ataxic) breathing. SP-saporin-injected rats also experienced sleep deficits and extraordinary sensitivity to anesthesia.

Expression of μORs appear to be less widespread than NK1Rs among constituent preBötC neurons. Although expressed somewhat more sparsely, the application of μOR agonists like [D-Ala^{2}, NMe-Phe^{4}, Gly-ol^{5}]-enkephalin (i.e., DAMGO) potently slowed the inspiratory rhythm. Note, this observation in vitro presaged the 2010-2020's crisis of opioid-drug related deaths by respiratory failure, which are attributable in large part to depression of rhythm-generating function in the preBötC (but also see:).

In the late 1980s and early 1990s, following discovery of the preBötC, in vitro preparations from neonates were not yet widely accepted as experimental models of the respiratory neural control system in adults. Some groups argued that in vitro rhythms reflected gasping rather than breathing, despite the fact that in vitro preparations, show physiological levels of oxygen and pH even several hundred micrometers below the surface of the tissue. Thus, the SP-saporin experiments were critical for showing that the preBötC was necessary for normal breathing in un-anesthetized adult animals.

Nevertheless, one is confronted with a disparity of motor patterns. The pattern of phrenic or XII nerve activity in vitro shows an abrupt onset followed by a decremental pattern, whereas in vivo the inspiratory motor nerves typically show an incremental onset followed by a more precipitous offset. The differences in the motor patterns measured in adults in vivo and those of in vitro preparations can be explained age- and development-related differences, the loss of mechanical sensory feedback in vitro, and the temperature (in vitro preparations are typically maintained ~10 °C lower than physiological temperature).

SST and SST2a receptors are expressed by neurons in the preBötC. Unlike NK1R expression, which remains rather strong in regions caudal to the preBötC within the cervical spinal cord, SST expression appears to peak in the anterior-posterior axis at the region recognized as the preBötC. Could SST-expressing preBötC neurons be markers for the preBötC core? Investigators installed in the preBötC a peptide receptor from fruit fly, adapted for expression in mammals, that activates potassium channels. Whether awake or anesthetized, activation of those potassium channel-linked receptors in SST-expressing neurons of the preBötC reduced breathing movements, both their amplitude and frequency, and ultimately caused apnea, i.e., a lack of breathing. The exogenous peptide that activates the fly receptor was ultimately cleared from the central nervous system: injected rats nonetheless needed mechanical ventilation until they recovered from the experiment. Subsequent studies examined the underlying cellular mechanisms and have come to the conclusion that preBötC neurons expressing SST are related to transmission of the rhythm from core rhythmogenic neurons to premotor neurons inspiratory neurons. The SST "output" neurons are intermingled in the preBötC with rhythm-generating neurons, and their function is to coactivate and pass on inspiratory rhythm to dedicated premotor populations outside of the preBötC.

Other markers for the preBötC include peptide hormone thyrotropin releasing hormone (TRH) and the glycoprotein reelin.

In summary, the preBötC is the source of rhythmic activity that – once distributed to premotor and motoneurons of respiratory muscles – produces inspiratory breathing movements. The neurons that comprise the preBötC express NK1Rs, μORs, SST2a receptors, and SST. Each of these markers holds functional significance for modulation of preBötC rhythmicity, and their expression delineates the borders of the preBötC. SP accelerated inspiratory rhythms measured in vitro and ablation of NK1R-expressing preBötC neurons caused severe pathologies of breathing that were ultimately fatal. The μORs also map the preBötC and opioid drugs depress breathing rhythms, which is further evidence of the preeminent rhythmogenic role of the preBötC. SST is a peptide transmitter rather than a receptor, but its expression also maps the preBötC. SST-expressing neurons are breathing essential, but their role is linked to the production of motor output rather than generation of rhythm per se.

== Cellular composition of the preBötC ==
=== Excitatory (glutamatergic) neurons ===
The rhythm-generating core of preBötC incorporates glutamatergic interneurons that express the gene Slc17a6 (i.e., Vglut2). preBötC glutamatergic neurons also express NK1Rs and μORs, but probably not SST. Pharmacological studies showed that excitatory transmission, predominantly via AMPA- and kainate-type ionotropic glutamate receptors were essential for rhythm generation as well as transmission to premotor neurons and ultimately motor output. Furthermore, Vglut2-knockout mice fail to breathe at birth. Transverse slices from late-stage embryos of Vglut2-knockout mice fail to generate rhythmic activity in the preBötC. Nevertheless, the cellular composition of the preBötC appears relatively unperturbed and constituent neurons express electrical properties associated with the preBötC in early postnatal mice, which emphasizes the importance of excitatory synaptic interactions for rhythm generation.

=== Dbx1-derived neurons ===
A subset of preBötC glutamatergic neurons are derived from progenitor cells that express transcription factor Dbx1 (developing brain homeobox 1) during embryonic development. In slices from early postnatal Dbx1 reporter mice, Dbx1-derived preBötC neurons are rhythmically active in vitro in sync with inspiratory rhythm and motor output. Examined histologically, Dbx1-derived preBötC neurons express NK1Rs, μORs, SST2a receptors, as well as SST. Also in slices from postnatal Dbx1 reporter mice, the selective photonic ablation of Dbx1-derived preBötC neurons diminishes XII motor output magnitude and decelerates then irreversibly stops the XII rhythm. In adult mice that express light-sensitive cation channels (channelrhodopsin 2) in Dbx1-derived neurons, optogenetic photostimulation speeds up breathing and increases tidal volume of the breaths. Mice expressing proton pumps (archaerhodopsin) in Dbx1-derived preBötC neurons slows or stops breathing movements. When the breathing is slowed via photoinhibition of Dbx1-derived preBötC neurons, the tidal volume of the breaths is diminished.

Dbx1 is a useful marker for the core preBötC neurons, but with caveats. First, Dbx1 is expressed during embryonic development, which makes it more challenging (though far from impossible) to use as a marker or a tool to manipulate neuronal function compared to genes like Vglut2 that are expressed throughout life. Second, Dbx1, like Vglut2, marks output-related preBötC neurons as well as premotor neurons in the reticular formation that transmit to the hypoglossal motoneurons and phrenic premotor neurons upper cervical spinal cord. Third, Dbx1 is an embryonic transcription factor that governs the development of many populations in the brain and central nervous system, notably the V0 interneuron class involved in locomotion. Nevertheless, Dbx1 expression patterns can be mapped using Cre-Lox recombination in genetically modified mice to find and record preBötC core rhythmogenic interneurons.

=== Inhibitory (GABA- and glycinergic) neurons ===
Approximately half of preBötC interneurons are inhibitory, glycinergic or GABAergic. Inhibitory preBötC neurons modulate the amplitude as well as the frequency of the rhythmic inspiratory bursts. These inhibitory populations receive sensorimotor information from the nucleus of the solitary tract (NTS), located in the dorsomedial medulla near the XII motor nucleus and the dorsal motor nucleus of vagus. Inhibitory neurons project to core rhythmogenic preBötC neurons. During normal breathing, inhibitory neurons in the preBötC are recruited periodically during each breath to hasten inspiratory termination. That role profoundly influences phase transition from inspiration to post-inspiration, then expiration, and that speeds up breathing cycles. Without preBötC inhibitory microcircuits, the breathing rhythm is slower overall and 'stiff' in the sense that its oscillation stabilizes even when faced with normally effective respiratory drive like CO_{2} or SP. Inhibitory preBötC neurons also inhibit neurons involved in generating expiratory (exhale-related) rhythm to enforce an exclusively inspiratory phase when the preBötC is active.

== Eupnea and sigh ==
The preBötC produces two types of breathing rhythm in the presence of physiological levels of oxygen and carbon dioxide. In eupnea, or normal resting breathing, the preBötC generates a rhythm that is relatively fast (~2–4 Hz in rodents, ~0.1-0.2 Hz in humans) with each breath achieving a tidal volume of air movement. Sigh breaths, on the other hand, are much slower (cycle periods range from 1-4 min^{−1} in mammals) with breath amplitudes being two or three-fold larger than tidal volume. Both eupnea and sigh rhythms are generated within the pre-Bötzinger complex and both eupnea and sigh bursts can be recorded in rhythmically active brain-slices containing the pre-BotC. Robust sigh rhythmicity in slices requires that the slice retain some tissue immediately rostral to preBötC, which contains the cut axons from a rostral site at the level of the Facial (VII) cranial nucleus that projects to preBötC and delivers bombesin-like peptides, namely Gastrin-releasing peptide (GRP) and Neuromedin-B (NMB). Producing both inspiratory (eupnea-related) and sigh bursts appears to involve the majority of excitatory neurons in the preBötC (although see). However, each type of rhythmic activity appears to depend on different mechanisms. The sigh rhythm depends on synaptic mechanisms that involve P/Q type calcium channels, suggesting there is a subset of neurons with specialized synapses for this type of rhythm generation since only a very small number of respiratory neurons receive glutamatergic inputs that depend on P/Q type calcium currents, or emphasizing the need for calcium influx to produce sighs. The sigh burst rhythm also depends on mGluR8 receptor activation. Further, whether the preBötC network generates a predominantly eupneic rhythm or sigh rhythm appears to depend on acetylcholine modulation (muscarinic acetylcholine receptor activity (mAChR) PMID 18287547. A subset of preBotC neurons active during sigh, but not eupnea, so-called 'sigh-only' neurons has been identified PMID 18287547. Additionally, a different subset of preBotC neurons has been identified that have rhythmogenic bursting properties that even after being synaptically isolated, appear to intrinsically generate both eupneic and sigh-like rhythms PMID 18287547; similar to network behavior, whether these neurons generate eupneic or sigh-like activity depends on mAChR activation. The above studies suggest both intrinsic and synaptic mechanisms contribute to eupneic and sigh rhythmogenesis.

=== Gasping ===
Under low levels of oxygen, the preBötC rearranges its activity, to generate a rhythmic gasping-related pattern. The gasping rhythm is proposed to play a critical role in autoresuscitation, failure of which may contribute to, or underlie, Sudden Infant Death Syndrome (SIDS). Gasping-related rhythmic bursts of neural activity generated by the preBötC are characterized by faster rise time and shorter duration than eupnea, and gasp-activity occurs a lower frequency than eupnea. When under a low oxygenated state (hypoxia) the respiratory network responds by transitioning into an augmentation followed by a depression phase, controlled in the pre-BötC. During the depression phase, the inspiratory burst changes from an augmenting bell-shaped burst to a decrementing burst, a primary feature of gasping. Neuronal discharge patterns are altered during the depressed synaptic inhibition, evidence of a rearrangement of the network, presumably attributable to changes in synaptic connectivity strengths as well as modifications in the intrinsic properties of rhythmogenic preBötC neurons. Excitatory neuromodulators, including serotonin (a.k.a. 5-HT) acting via 5-HT type 2a receptors PMID 16525041 and norepinephrine acting via alpha-2 receptors PMID 21615559 likely play an important role in activating persistent sodium-dependent rhythmogenic mechanisms proposed to underlie gasping activity.

In summary, the preBötC gives rise to more than one breathing-related rhythm: inspiratory (eupnea), sigh, and gasping. This single neuronal network can create multiple respiratory rhythmic patterns and is by itself both necessary and sufficient to generate these respiratory rhythms.

== Neighboring respiratory sites and nuclei ==
Located within the ventrolateral medulla, the pre-Bötzinger complex contains subnetworks that hold distinct synapses and intrinsic membrane properties. In mammals, the respiratory network system and the nuclei controlling breathing modulation are found along the neuronal axis. The neuronal networks involved in respiratory function are located in the ventral respiratory column (VRC). From rostral to caudal, these networks include the retrotrapezoid nucleus/parafacial respiratory group complex (RTN/pFRG) the Bötzinger complex, the preBötzinger complex (preBötC), as well as the rostral and the caudal divisions of the ventral respiratory group (rVRG and cVRG). The dorsal pons, including the Kölliker-Fuse and the parabrachial nuclei, play an important role in respiratory control and rhythm generation. Other areas that aid in breathing control are the cerebellum, neocortex, and the periaqueductal gray (speech and breathing), although the mechanisms are not yet well explained. Mononsynaptic projections to the preBötC have been mapped. Efferent projections from the preBötC to other respiratory and non-respiratory sites throughout the brain and central nervous system have been mapped too.

== Mechanism of rhythm generation ==
The exact mechanism of the rhythm generation and transmission to motor nuclei remains controversial and the topic of much research

== Ionic currents ==
=== Persistent sodium current (I_{NaP}) ===
There are several inward currents that are proposed to help produce action potentials and bursts in pacemaker neurons. There are two main voltage dependent sodium currents that contribute to the depolarization and firing of action potentials in neurons. The fast and transient sodium current produces a large depolarization that fires the initial action potential in neurons, however this current is quickly inactivated and does not help maintain bursting activity in neurons. To achieve bursts, a persistent sodium current provides enough depolarization to facilitate the firing of action potentials during a burst. Unlike the fast and transient sodium current, the persistent sodium current (I_{NaP}) is activated at very low membrane potentials and has a much slower inactivation, which allows neurons to intrinsically fire action potentials at sub-threshold membrane potentials. Studies have shown that the inactivation of this persistent sodium current helps end bursts in pacemaker neurons. The amount of time it takes for I_{NaP} to become activated again establishes the timeframe between each burst. The neuron can receive synaptic inputs and different amounts of inward and outward currents to regulate the time between each burst, which ultimately helps generate a specific breathing pattern.

=== NALCN ===
NALCN sodium leak channels have been hypothesized to give rise to an inward current that may play an important role in the modulation of bursting and spiking activity. These nonselective cation channels may provide a voltage-independent sodium current that also helps slightly depolarize neurons. The channels are regulated by G protein–coupled receptors that can activate or inhibit the NALCN channels depending on the neurotransmitter that binds the receptor and the specific signaling pathway that is involved. Activation of M3 muscarinic receptors by acetylcholine and NK1 by Substance P significantly increases NALCN currents, while activation of CaSR by calcium stops the flow of the currents. Since NALCN sodium leak channels may contribute to the depolarization of neurons, their regulation by G-protein coupled receptors may be vital for the alteration of bursting and breathing rhythms.

=== Calcium-activated non-specific cation current (I_{CAN}) ===
Other inward currents that help generate intrinsic spiking and bursting in pacemaker neurons are the calcium current and calcium-activated nonspecific currents (I_{CAN}). When a neuron becomes depolarized, voltage gated calcium channels become activated and calcium is able to flow into the cell which usually leads to the release of neurotransmitters. Calcium-sensitive dyes have shown that internal concentrations of calcium increase during bursts. The activation of different calcium channels has distinct effects on the activity of neurons in the pre-Bötzinger complex. L-type calcium channels are known to increase the frequency of action potentials in some neurons, which might be the reason calcium influx through these channels has been observed during the augmentation when tissues have low levels of oxygen. P/Q-type calcium channels are mainly responsible for the release of neurotransmitters that excite, or activate, postsynaptic neurons. Studies have shown that blockage of these channels leads to the inhibition of sighs, which indicates calcium flow through these channels is necessary for sighs. Other research has also suggested that calcium flow through N-type calcium channels is essential for normal breathing, and is responsible for the activation of calcium-dependent potassium channels. Calcium-activated nonselective cation currents are important for the intrinsic spiking and bursting activity in CS pacemaker neurons. Metabotropic glutamate 1/5 receptors appear to be important for the increase in intracellular calcium that activate I_{CAN}. The initial burst in a neuron usually leads to the activation of the transient sodium current and the several types of calcium currents. These currents depolarize the cell further enough to activate NMDA receptors and I_{CAN}, which helps cell regenerate its bursts.

The ratio between inward and outward currents helps determine the activity of pacemaker neurons in the pre-Bötzinger complex. The major outward currents involved in the regulation of neuron activity are potassium currents. Although the exact role of potassium currents is still being investigated, it appears that potassium and sodium leak currents are crucial for the rhythmicity of the pre-Bötzinger complex. Transient A-type potassium currents are more common in neurons that are involved in the inspiration process. When A-type potassium currents were blocked with 4-AP in slices of the pre-Bötzinger complex, synchronized bursts in inspiratory neurons was affected as well as communication with hypoglossal motor pools that help regulate breathing. This suggests that transient A-type potassium currents are needed for the synchronized bursts in inspiratory neurons and for effective respiratory control. Other potassium channels like large conductance calcium-dependent potassium channels and sodium chloride dependent potassium channels appear to end burst potentials in neurons. Moreover, ATP-dependent potassium channels help neurons detect changes in energy or oxygen levels to modify breathing patterns. These channels are activated by decreases in ATP, which suggests they provide the needed hyperpolarization during hypoxia.

== Neuromodulation of preBötC rhythmicity ==
Several synthetic compounds have been shown to act on neurons specific to the preBötC, most being selective agonists or antagonists to receptor subtypes on neurons in the vicinity. Since many of these neurons express GABA, glutamate, serotonin and adenosine receptors, chemicals custom tailored to bind at these sites are most effective at altering respiratory rhythm.

Adenosine modulates the preBötC output via activation of the A_{1} and A_{2A} receptor subtypes. An adenosine A_{1} receptor agonist has been shown to depress preBötC rhythmogenesis independent of the neurotransmitters GABA and glycine in in-vitro preparations from 0- to 7-day-old mice. Another synthetic drug specific to the adenosine A_{2A} receptor subtype is CGS-21680 that has been shown to cause apneas in 14- to 21-day-old rat pups in vivo. For this reason, it has been used as a model to study pathological conditions such as apnea of prematurity and sudden infant death syndrome.

The complex regulation of respiratory rhythm involves the integration of multiple signaling molecules and the activation of numerous diverse metabotropic and ionotropic receptors. These include norepinephrine, serotonin, acetylcholine, substance P, ATP, TRH, somatostatin, dopamine, endorphins, and adenosine, which in turn activate g-protein coupled receptors to produce the diverse responses mediated by the pre-Bötzinger complex.

Nonpacemaker and pacemaker neurons involved in inspiration are stimulated by NE. They are found within the pre-BötC and act via alpha-1, alpha-2, and beta-noradrenergic mechanisms. NE induces I_{CAN}-dependent bursting in active nonpacemakers and depolarizes CI pacemakers, increasing the frequency of their bursting. In CS pacemakers, NE increases only the amplitude of the depolarizing drive potential and the number of action potentials during the burst, but does not affect the burst frequency in CS pacemakers, unlike in CI pacemakers.

Serotonergic neurons are also involved in breathing systems. Their actions are diverse and dependent upon the activity level and species of the animal. Serotonin plays a critical role in altering the pacemaker neurons involved in gasping and normal respiratory activity. Blocking of the 5-HT2 receptor eliminates the bursts occurring in the pacemaker neurons and leads to the abolishing of gasps. The blocking of this receptor is therefore problematic, especially in SIDS, because gasping is an important mechanism involved in autoresuscitation. A lack of serotonin binding to the serotonin receptor 2 leads to the inability to autoresuscitation due to the lack of drive for gasping.

Substance P, a peptidergic modulator, also plays a role in neuromodulation of the pre-BötC. It is often coreleased with other neurotransmitters. Substance P activates the inspiratory frequency at the level of the network and behavioral systems. Cellularly, substance P is involved in the depolarization of nonpacemaker neurons slowly, causing an increase in action potential firing rate. The neuropeptide can also activate CS pacemakers and less dramatically, CI pacemakers. This leads to an increase in burst amplitude, frequency, and duration. When Substance P is coreleased with serotonin, it plays a crucial role in hypoxic response. This occurs because substance P stabilizes the respiratory rhythm through depolarization of neurons and activation of Pacemaker neurons.

Acetylcholine plays an important modulatory role on the respiratory system by altering nicotinic and muscarinic receptors. The suppression of muscarinic receptors and the activation of nicotinic receptors due to prenatal exposure to nicotine have been linked to SIDS. This is due to the reduction of excitatory synaptic transmission in a nucleus and increased excitability in motor neurons caused by nicotinic activation.

Many other neuromodulators have roles in respiration. The aforementioned are simply three examples.

== Homeostatic changes in preBötC rhythmicity ==
Investigation of the respiratory response to Acute intermittent hypoxia (AIH), repeated episodes of hypoxia, reveals connection to various breathing disorders, such as Rett syndrome and obstructive sleep apnea. AIH leads to persistent increases in respiratory frequency and amplitude of integrated motor neuronal bursts in vivo. These changes lasting for 90 minutes or longer are termed long-term facilitation (LTF). AIH causes homeostatic changes in multiple sites of the respiratory system; the pre-BötC is likely the site for the LTF, since intermittent hypoxia causes an increase in persistent frequency after ongoing hypoxia. The respiratory system is regulated by multiple forms of long-term synaptic plasticity. The role of synaptic inhibition has been proved widespread and critical within the expiratory Botzinger complex respiratory network, through cross-correlation and antidromic mapping techniques. The inhibitory connections discovered indicate their ability to connect different classes of neurons, their importance in regulating the interval of inspiration, and their ability to control driving potential of respiratory neurons. These characteristics show the interaction between the parafacial respiratory group and the pre-Bötzinger complex, which allows for active expiration to be produced by synaptic inhibition within the respiratory network. Synaptic inhibition is critical for allowing the pre-Bötzinger complex to communicate with other respiratory centers in order to generate respiratory activity.

Glycinergic and GABAergic inhibitory neurons make up half of all inspiratory neurons. Exposure of the pre-Bötzinger complex to these inhibitory neurotransmitters results in the rhythmic nature associated with respiration. Blocking this inhibition from Glycine or GABA causes its neurons to be incapable of switching from the active phase to the inspiration phase, demonstrated by shorter inspiratory activity (as seen in vivo). However, the absence of inhibitory synapses still resulted in rhythmic respiratory activity in vitro and in situ. This is largely due to the fact that respiratory rhythm results from numerous aspects, with synaptic inhibition playing only a single part.

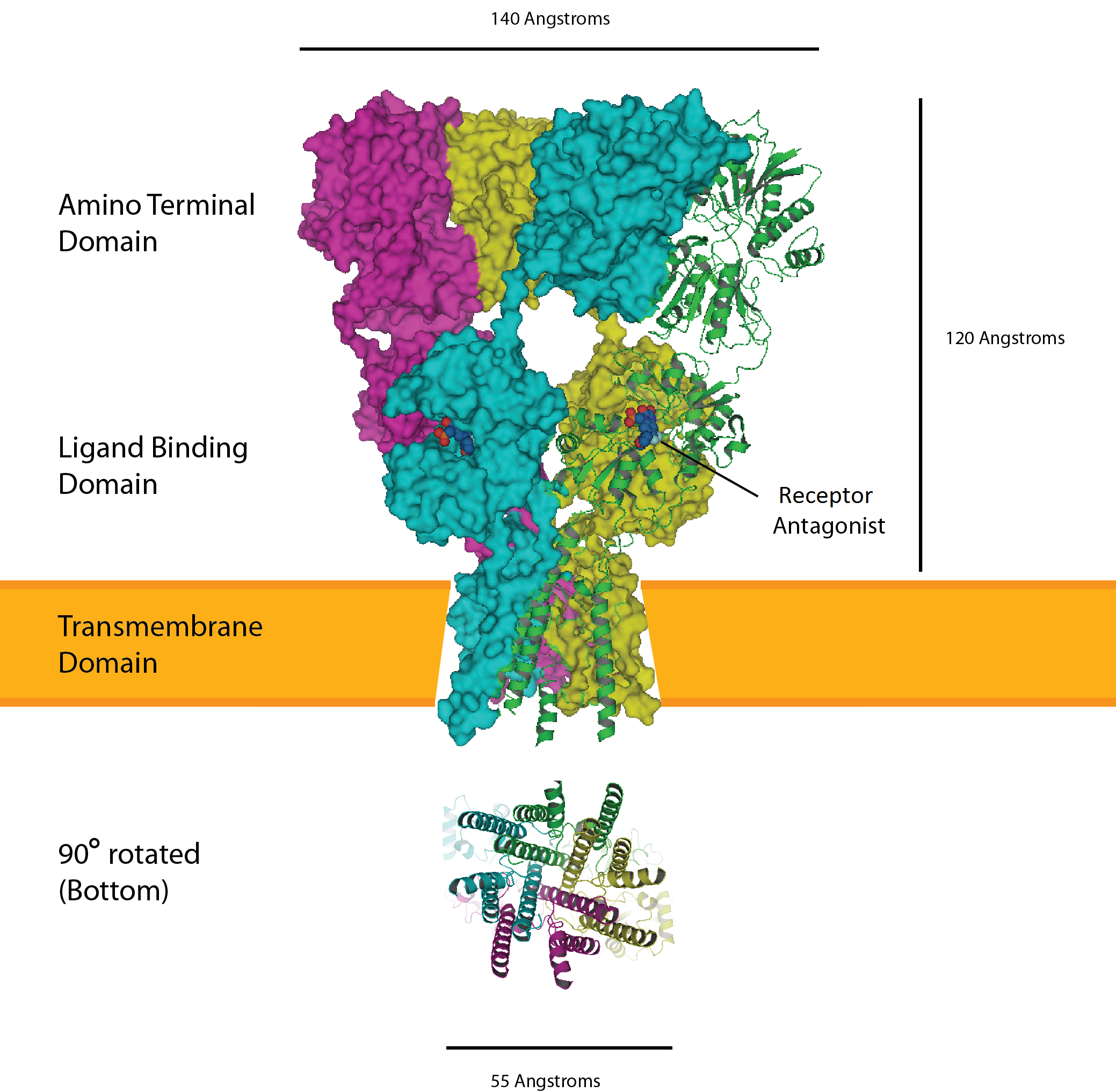
AMPA receptor

In addition to the inhibitory synaptic regulation of respiratory rhythm within the pre-Bötzinger complex, there is also an excitatory component utilizing mostly AMPA receptors. The generation of inspirations is due to a signaling cascade involving transient Ca2+ influx as a result of glutamate activating a postsynaptic receptor. In addition to glutamates role in activating the synaptic drive of inspiration, it is also understood that pacemaker neurons, with autonomous voltage-dependent properties, are also responsible for the generation of respiratory rhythm. Evidence of this is seen when isolating neurons within the pre-Bötzinger complex, which results in rhythmic bursts due to synaptically coupled micronetworks.

However, the generation of respiratory rhythm requires other excitatory components, such as glutamate, in order to produce a wide range of behavioral functions including eupneic and sigh activity. The pre-Bötzinger complex is responsible for generating the wide variety of components that make up the respiratory rhythm. The accomplishment of these precise activities requires distinct neuron populations that overlap to allow the generation of different respiratory actions. Eupneic activity is generated using the excitatory mechanism through the NMDA glutamate receptor. Sighs have a differential generation originating from pacemaker neurons. The pre-Bötzinger complex is capable of generating differential rhythmic activities due to the intricate integration of modulatory, synaptic, and intrinsic properties of the neurons involved.

== Oxygen sensing ==
In addition to its involvement in generating respiratory rhythm, the pre-Bötzinger complex is also capable of integrating sensory information from changes in the biochemical environment, particularly oxygen. The capability to detect focal hypoxia causes an excitatory response in the motor output responsible for respiration, which causes alterations in the firing pattern of neurons within the pre-Bötzinger complex. Among these changes are the transition of a fully integrated network involving complex networks and autonomous mechanisms, to a system dependent on the activity of pacemaker neurons through sodium current activation. Hypoxia results in gasping due to the increased dependence on the sodium current and the overlap in networks between the generation of respiratory rhythm and intrinsic oxygen sensitization.

== Pathologies and the preBötC ==
Disturbances in neuromodulatory processes acting on ion channels, receptors, and second messengers have been associated with numerous pathophysiological conditions, such as Rett syndrome and sudden infant death syndrome.

Rhythmic breathing continuously adapts to posture, activity level, speech, and can reveal whether someone is calm, agitated, or scared. Plasticity of the mechanisms involved in respiratory behavior is modulated in part by the preBötC. Disruption causes irreversible loss or major disruption of breathing in vivo. The frequency and amplitude change according to the behavioral and metabolic demands of the organism it controls. Breathing is thus extremely sensitive to the internal state of the organism.

=== Associated diseases ===
- Rett syndrome
- Sleep apnea

== See also ==
- Control of respiration
- Ventral respiratory group
