= Botzinger complex =

Group of neurons located in rostral ventrolateral medulla, and ventral respiratory column

In mammals, the Bötzinger complex (BötC) is a group of mainly expiratory neurons located within the ventral respiratory column in the rostral ventrolateral medulla (immediately caudal to the facial nucleus and ventral to the compact formation of the nucleus ambiguus).

== Function ==
The Bötzinger complex plays an important role in controlling breathing and response to hypoxia. It consists primarily of glycinergic neurons which inhibit the activity of inspiratory neurons. In the respiratory cycle, Bötzinger neurons show mainly E-augmenting or E-decrementing activity.

== Name ==
The Bötzinger complex was named by the participants of a scientific meeting held in Hirschhorn in 1980 after a bottle of white wine named Botzinger present at the dinner table during the conference dinner.

== Connections ==
The Bötzinger Complex has projections to:

- Phrenic pre-motor neurons in the medulla
- Phrenic motor neurons in the cervical spinal cord
- The dorsal respiratory group (DRG)
- Ventral respiratory group (VRG)
- Pre-Bötzinger complex
- Bötzinger complex itself
- Parabrachial Kolliker-Fuse nucleus

Only augmenting expiratory neurons of BötC, which are exclusively glycinergic, project to the phrenic nucleus.

Projections to the Bötzinger complex include the nucleus tractus solitarii (NTS) and VRG.

== Physiology ==
These neurons may act as intrinsic pacemakers. E-decrementing neurons display an initial burst of activity followed by decrease towards the end of expiration. Aug-E neurons begin firing during the E2 phase and end before the phrenic nerve burst.
