= George Grossberg =

American geriatric psychiatrist

George T. Grossberg is the Samuel W. Fordyce professor and director of Geriatric Psychiatry in the Department of Psychiatry at Saint Louis University School of Medicine. He is a past president of the American Association for Geriatric Psychiatry and of the International Psychogeriatric Association. He is a member of the AMDA – The Society for Post-Acute and Long-Term Care Medicine. Dr. Grossberg is a consistent awardee of America's Best Doctors for his work as a board certified geriatric psychiatrist and exceptional research on Alzheimer's disease.He founded the Geriatric Psychiatry Program, which was the first of its kind back in 1979 Missouri.

Grossberg was born in Hajdúböszörmény, Hungary and came to the United States as a refugee.
