= The American Journal of Geriatric Psychiatry =

- Discipline: Geriatric psychiatry
- Language: English
- Edited by: Charles F. Reynolds III

Publication details
- History: 1993-present
- Publisher: Elsevier
- Frequency: Quarterly
- Impact factor: 3.488 (2018)

Standard abbreviations
- ISO 4: Am. J. Geriatr. Psychiatry

Indexing
- CODEN: AJGPE8
- ISSN: 1064-7481 (print); 1545-7214 (web)
- OCLC no.: 226160534

Links
- Journal homepage; Online access; Online archive

The American Journal of Geriatric Psychiatry is a quarterly peer-reviewed medical journal covering geriatric psychiatry. It was established in 1993 and is published by Elsevier on behalf of the American Association for Geriatric Psychiatry. The editor-in-chief is Charles F. Reynolds, III (University of Pittsburgh Medical Center). According to the Journal Citation Reports, the journal has a 2014 impact factor of 4.235.
