= Burke Museum of Natural History and Culture =

Museum in Seattle

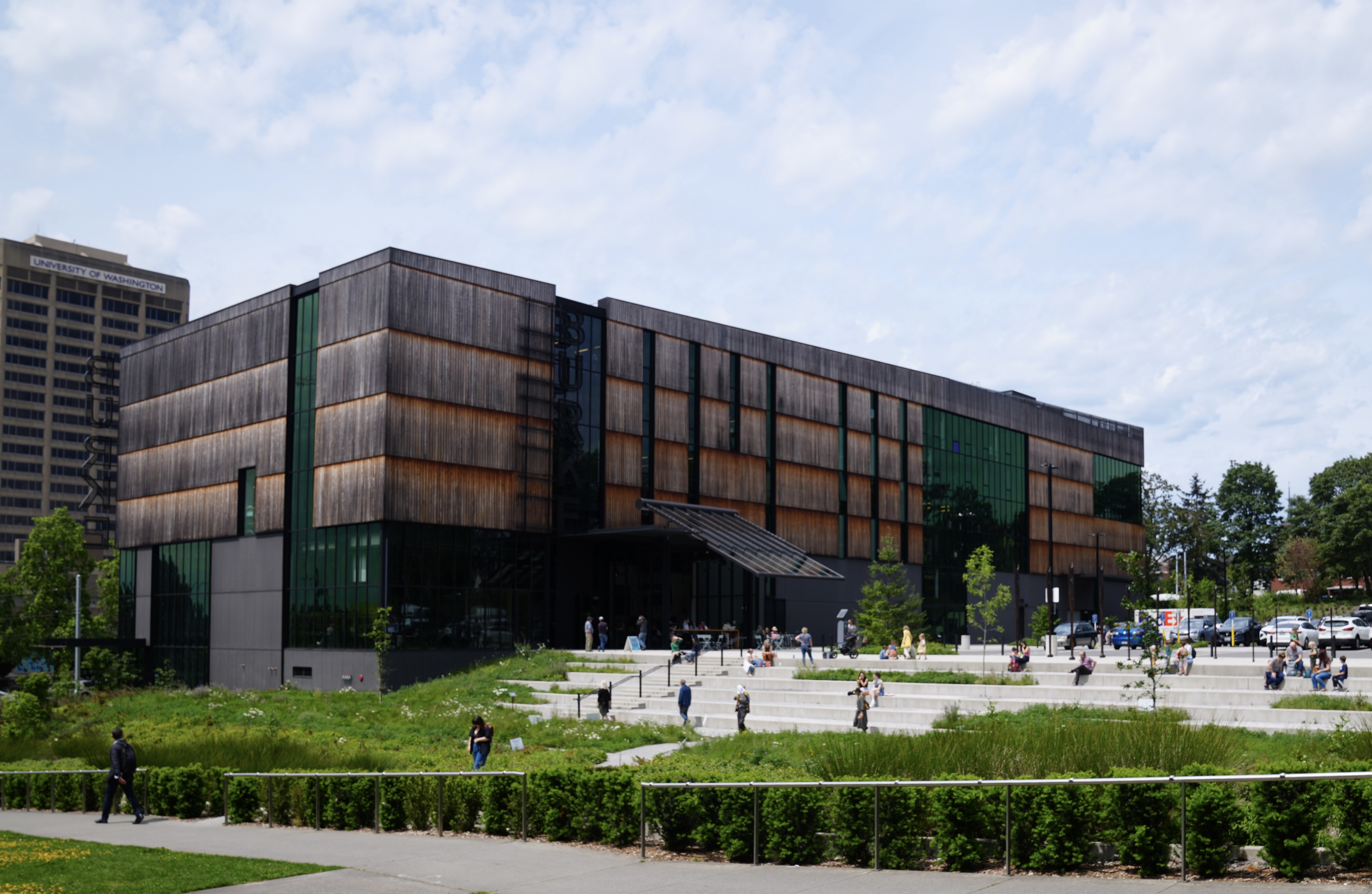
- Exterior of the Burke Museum
- Established: 1899
- Location: 4303 Memorial Way Northeast, Seattle, Washington, United States
- Coordinates: 47.660570°N 122.310699°W
- Type: Natural history museum
- Accreditation: American Alliance of Museums
- Collection size: 16 million
- Visitors: 104,000 (2017)
- Director: Gabriela Chavarria
- Owner: University of Washington College of Arts and Sciences
- Website: www.burkemuseum.org

The Burke Museum of Natural History and Culture (commonly as Burke Museum) is the natural history museum of the University of Washington in Seattle, Washington. It is administered by the Arts Division of the College of Arts and Sciences of the University of Washington.

Established in 1899 as the Washington State Museum, the museum traces its origins to a high school naturalist club formed in 1879. The museum is the oldest in Washington state and boasts a collection of more than 16 million artifacts, including the world's largest collection of spread bird wings. The Burke Museum is the official state museum of Washington.

== History ==
=== Young Naturalists Society ===
The roots of the Burke Museum can be traced to a natural history club formed by high school students in the 19th century. The group was formed in December 1879 by students Edmond S. Meany, J. O. Young, P. Brooks Randolph, and Charles Denny. Denny's father, city founder Arthur Denny, was a regent of the Territorial University of Washington and arranged for the group to meet on campus. The Young Naturalists adopted a constitution and bylaws, and the official name "Young Naturalists Society", in 1880. As the founding members graduated high school and matriculated to the university, the membership of the Young Naturalists expanded to include university students.

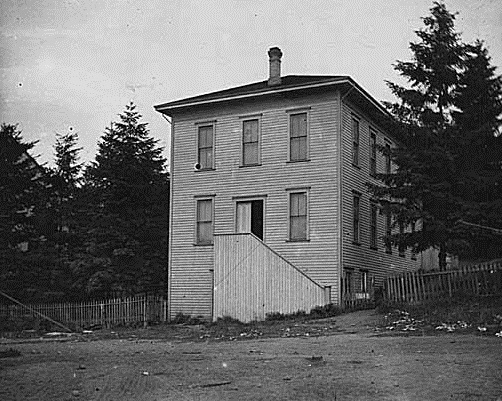
The Young Naturalists Society clubhouse in Seattle, pictured probably in the late 1800s.

In 1882 Orson "Bug" Johnson (Orson Bennett Johnson) was retained as a biology instructor at the University of Washington, bringing 20,000 animal specimens with him. Johnson immediately involved himself with the Young Naturalists, and the addition of his collection gave the club the largest natural history collection in the Pacific Northwest. Under Johnson's direction, the Young Naturalists began expanding this nucleus of specimens and artifacts, which were stored in a backroom of the Denny home. A permanent structure to house the growing collection was built on the Territorial University's campus in 1886, with the club soliciting donations to fund its construction. Many specimens in the collection were regularly borrowed by university faculty to assist in instruction.

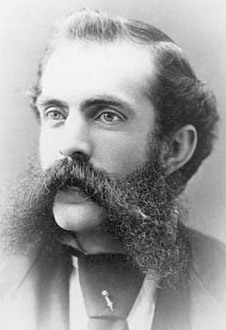
Orson "Bug" Johnson led the Young Naturalists to acquire the largest natural history collection in the Pacific Northwest.

In the 1890s Edmond Meany returned to teach history at the university. He led a revitalization of the group that he had helped found a decade before, bringing in new members, including women. By this point the society's collection had grown to include more than 60,000 specimens.

=== Transition to the Washington State Museum ===
The University of Washington moved its campus from downtown Seattle to its present location in 1895. The portion of the Young Naturalists collection that had been used in university instruction was relocated to the university's Denny Hall while the remainder stayed in the Young Naturalists clubhouse downtown. In 1899 the Washington State Legislature designated the portion of Denny Hall used to house the collection as the Washington State Museum. In 1904 the Young Naturalists voted to donate the rest of their collection to the Washington State Museum and disband.

=== Carousel of buildings ===
The 1909 Alaska–Yukon–Pacific Exposition (AYP Expo) brought a boon of construction to the University of Washington's campus. When the fair ended, the Washington State Museum moved into its first dedicated building, the fair's former California Building.

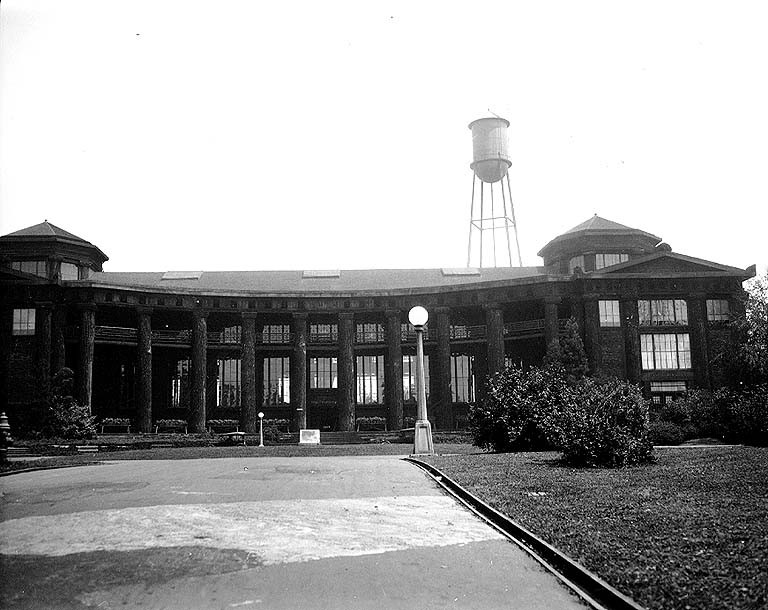
Washington State Museum in the former Forestry Building in 1922. The building was constructed for the AYPE Exposition

Persistent leaks in that facility caused it to later relocate to the fair's former Forestry Building which, it was soon discovered, was infested with bark beetles. For four years, from 1923 to 1927, the museum's collections were disbursed around campus.

The situation was finally resolved in 1927 when the museum moved into what had originally been constructed as the Washington State Building for the AYP Expo.

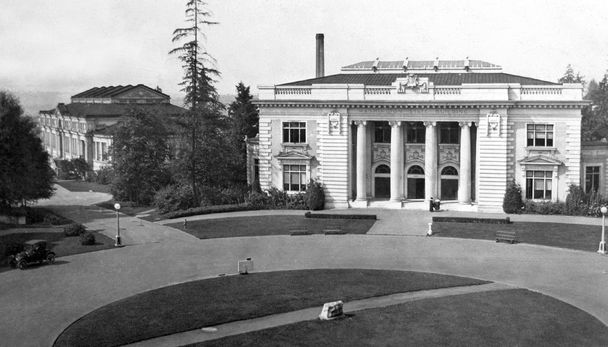
This photograph of the Washington State Building, later the Washington State Museum, was taken probably in 1909.

In 1929, Erna Gunther became the museum's director, a post she would hold for more than 25 years.

The museum found itself, once again, displaced in 1957 after its AYP Expo-era building was condemned.

=== New name and buildings ===
When Thomas Burke died in 1925, his wife, Caroline McGilvra Burke, sought an appropriate monument for her husband that would "advance the cause of a better mutual understanding between ... the people of the Pacific shores." A collector of Native American artifacts herself, she bequeathed her personal collection to the museum following her death in 1932. The Burke estate offered to help fund a new state museum, with one major stipulation - the structure had to be named after Burke. Some University officials balked at this, as did Erna Gunther. The institution had been known as the Washington State Museum since 1899, and the Burke funds would only go toward a third of the construction costs. Other funds came from a National Science Foundation grant, but the new building was still smaller than one that Erna Gunther recommended. Nevertheless, the new facility was ultimately dedicated on May 3, 1964, with its new director, Walter Fairservis, at the helm.

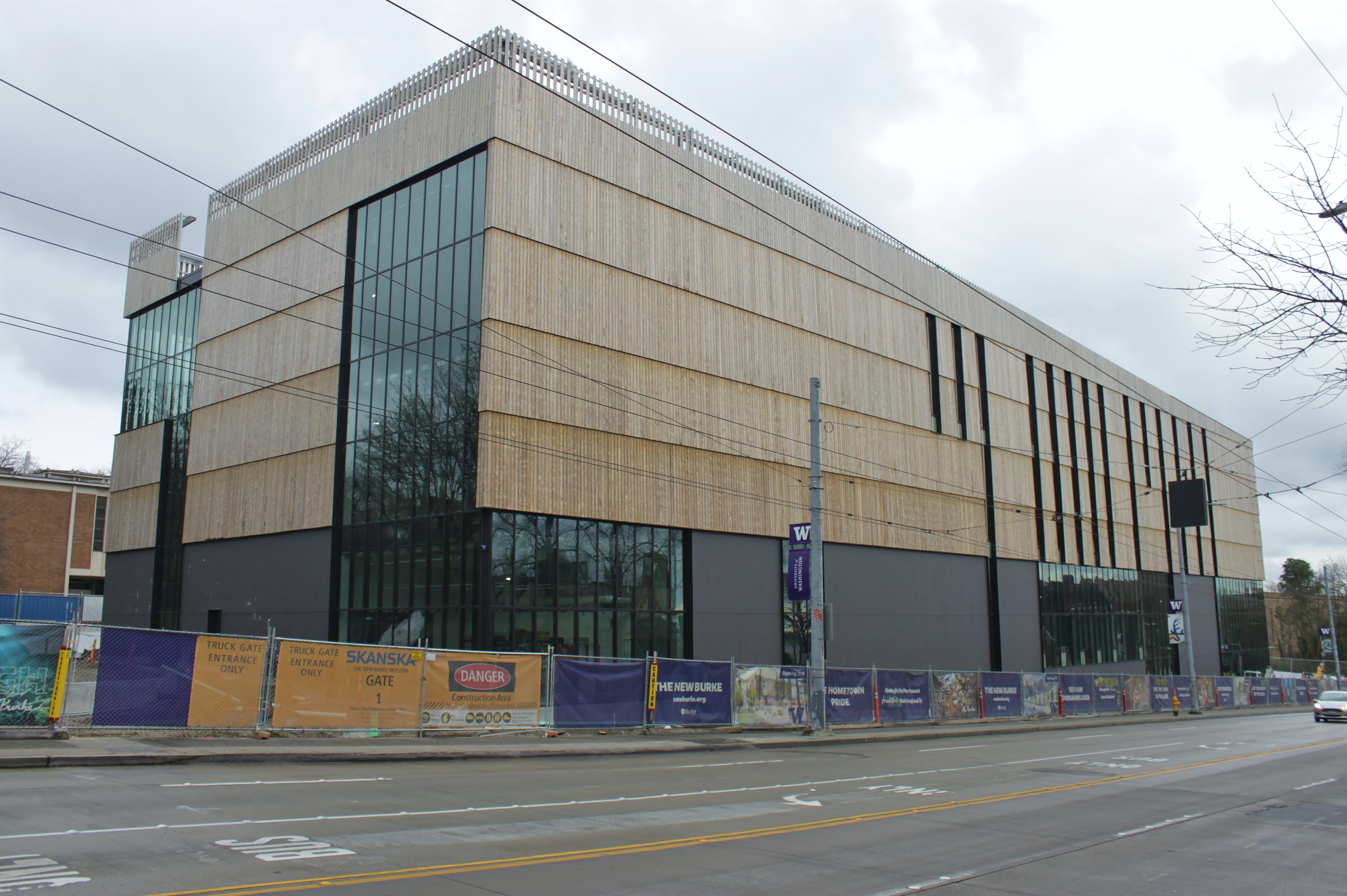
The new building under construction in early 2018

In 1996, the museum launched a ten-year plan to move its exhibition space off campus and into a downtown Seattle location. Under the proposal, curators and preservationists would continue to work at the University of Washington while exhibits would be hosted at a new site. The proposal ultimately did not materialize. In 2014, the museum made another push for a new facility, asking the Washington State Legislature for half the $95 million needed to construct a 110,000 square-foot facility to replace its current building. The new Burke Museum building finished construction in 2018, and the old building closed at the end of the year to transfer the collection's 16 million items before its demolition in April 2019. The new museum cost $106 million to construct and opened to the public on October 12, 2019. The new building, designed by UW alum Tom Kundig, features large windows into research areas to showcase parts of the collection that were not previously exhibited. A garden with 60 species of Washington-native plants has been planted around the new building and its adjacent courtyard, designed to host small events. The new museum also has a small cafe, Off the Rez, that serves Native American cuisine.

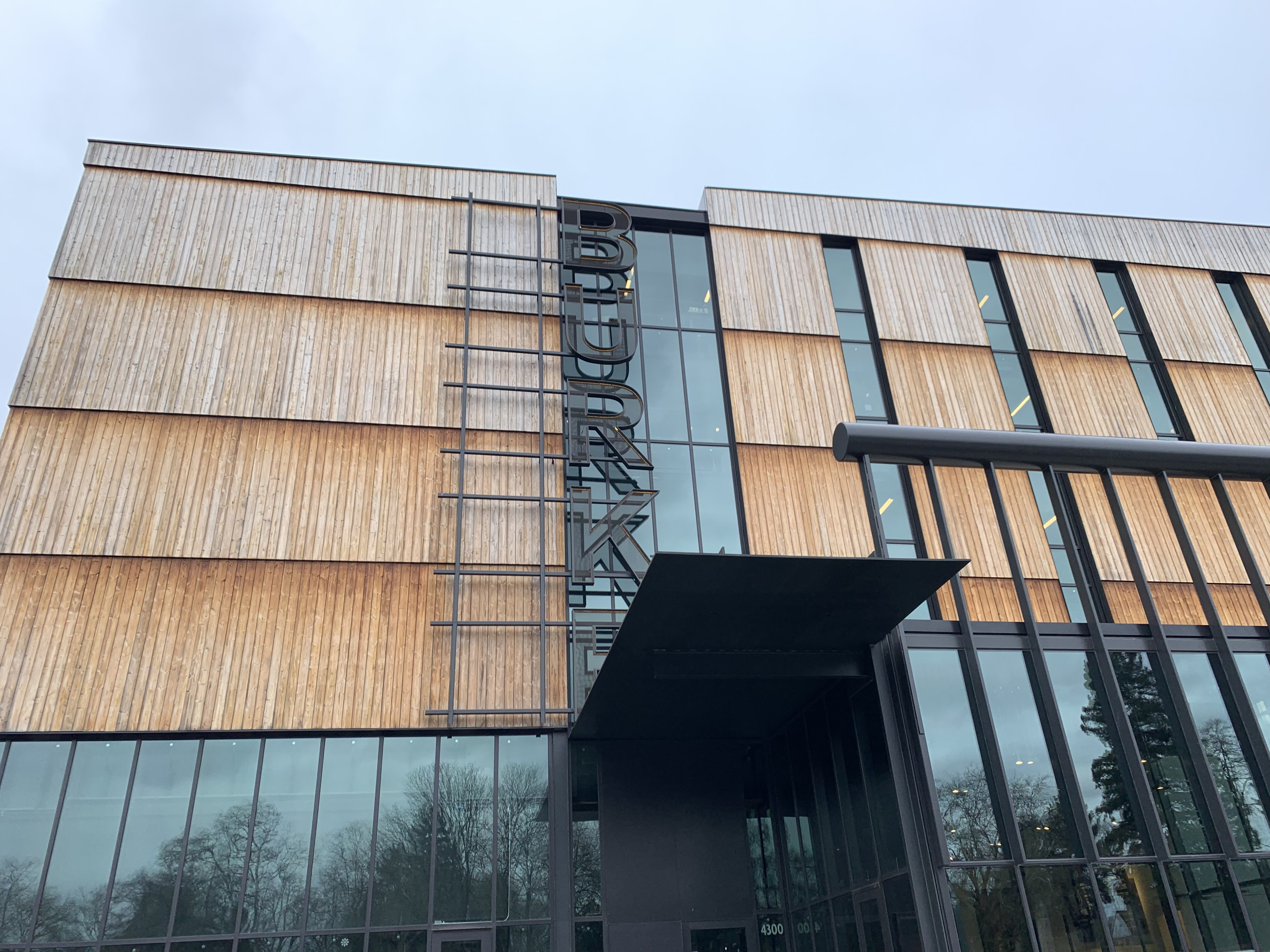
Main entrance to the new Burke Museum building in January 2020.

== Collections ==
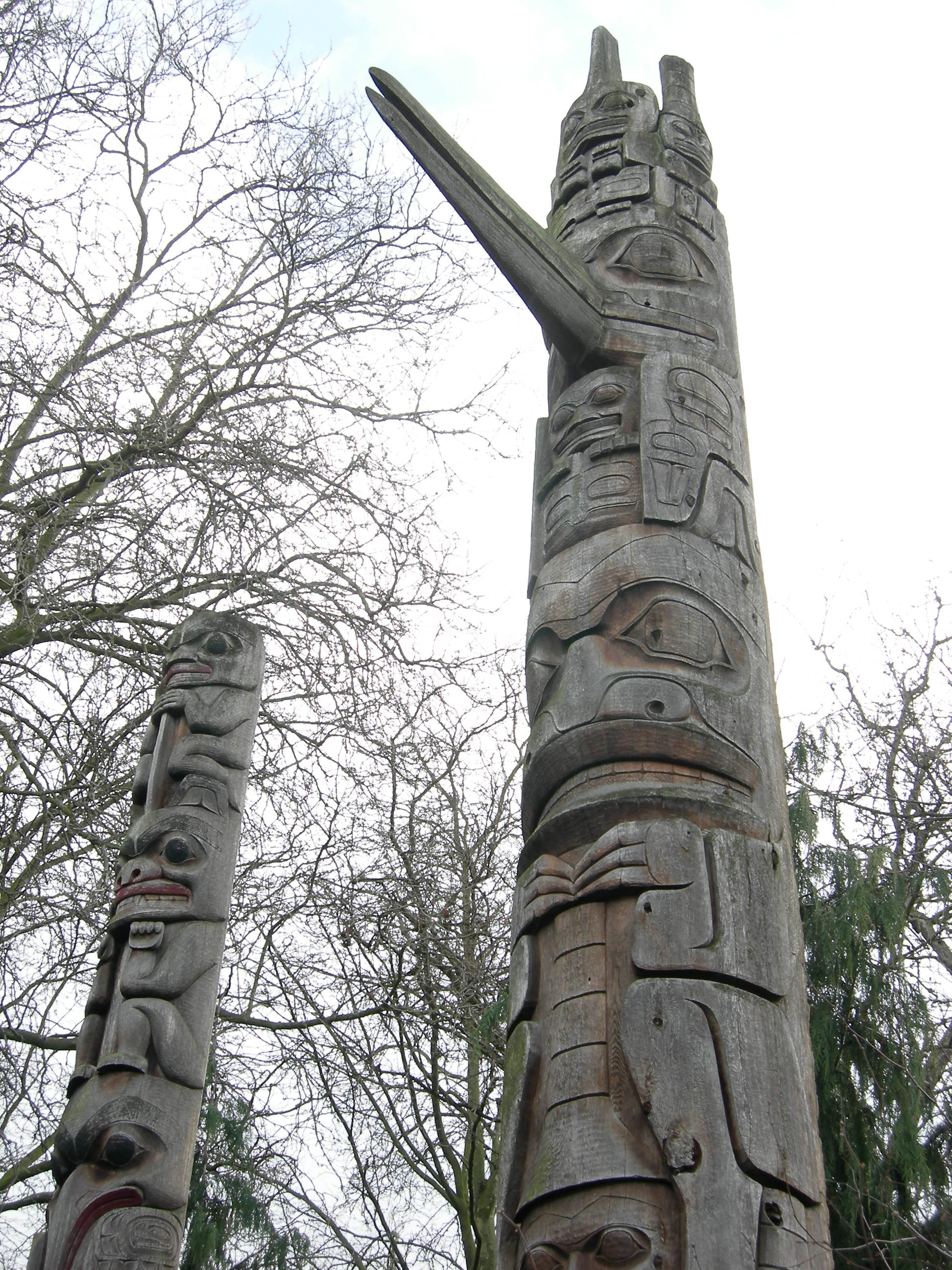
Totem poles outside the Burke Museum

The museum houses more than 16 million artifacts and specimens in its anthropology, biology, and geology research divisions. According to the museum, its ornithology division includes the largest collection of spread bird wings in the world, while the museum's collection of frozen bird tissues is the world's second largest. The Mammalogy Collection, which is managed by University of Washington professor and Burke Museum curator Sharlene Santana, contains more than 55,000 mammal specimens, and is regarded as the 10th largest collection of mammals in a North American university. The museum states that its collection of Northwest Coast ethnographic material is the fifth largest collection of Native American art in the world, numbering 10,000 objects, among which are "the important early Swan, Eells, Emmons, and Waters collections, as well as the unmatched Blackman-Hall and Ottenberg contemporary silkscreen print collections, and the Steinman contemporary Northwest Coast sculpture collection." The museum's Northwest Coast image research database includes "the Holm/Wright collection of images of Northwest Coast art from 200 museums and private collections, the Harris collection of Northwest Coast silver jewelry images, and de Menil photographs of Northwest Coast totem poles, as well as the George MacDonald Archive of historical Northwest Coast photographs."

== Exhibits ==
=== Past long-term exhibits ===
Prior to its temporary closure in 2018, the museum displayed three long-term exhibits: "Life and Times of Washington State", "Pacific Voices", and "Treasures of the Burke". "Life and Times of Washington State" was a natural history exhibit on the 545-million-year evolution of the Northwest region. Features of this exhibit included large-scale fossils such as an Allosaurus skeleton cast and a giant ground sloth fossil found during the construction of Sea-Tac International Airport. There were also displays that explained the geologic history of the area and its influence on the terrain and climate.

"Pacific Voices" was a cultural exhibit that told the stories or traditions of 19 different Native American and Pacific Rim cultures through art, artifacts, ceremonial objects, and audio/visual documentaries.

=== Temporary exhibits ===
The Burke also hosts a schedule of different exhibits throughout the year in its temporary gallery. These changing exhibits include traveling exhibits organized by other institutions and original exhibits curated by Burke staff. In November 2022 the Burke hosted "Body Language: Reawakening Cultural Tattooing of the Northwest."

=== Present long-term exhibits ===
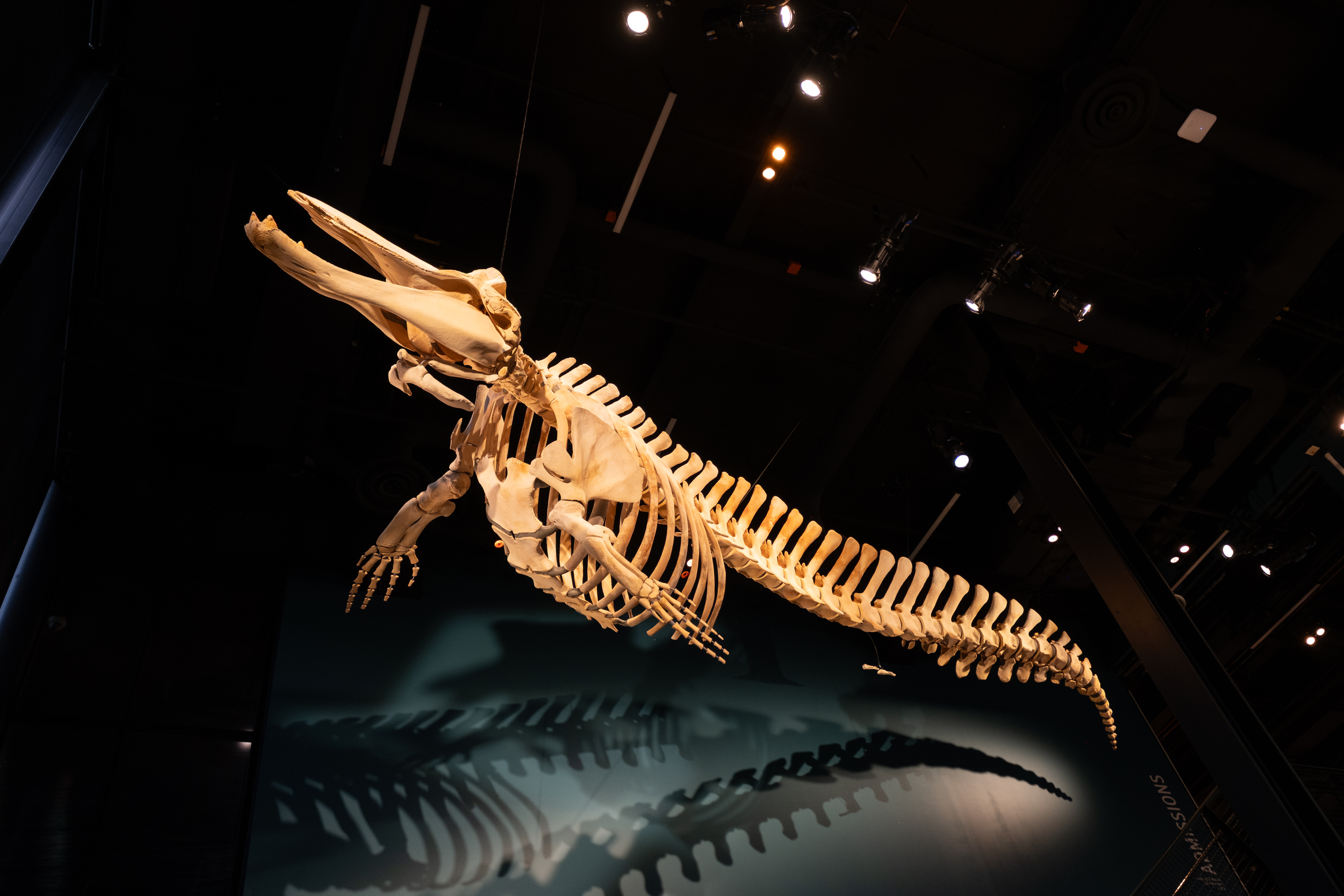
A skeleton of a Baird’s beaked whale is displayed in the main lobby. This specimen washed ashore on a Washington beach in 2015.

The museum reopened in its new building on October 12, 2019, with several new exhibits: "Culture is Living", "Northwest Native Art", "Amazing Life", "Our Material World", and "Fossils Uncovered". Each gallery focuses on a particular category of Washington State natural history and culture. In "Culture is Living", patrons can engage with objects past and present and hear from community across the Pacific. "Fossils Uncovered" includes one of the best-preserved T. rex skulls in the world, as well as numerous other fossils.

== Publications ==
The museum publishes a scientific journal, Burke Museum Contributions in Anthropology and Natural History, established in 1986.

== Museum governance ==
=== Governing body ===
The museum is administered through the University of Washington College of Arts and Sciences; the University of Washington Board of Regents serves as the museum's governing body.

=== BMA ===
The Burke Museum Association (BMA) is an organization made up of the Burke's board of trustees and an advisory council. Their mission is to actively support the Burke Museum by increasing public visibility, raising public and private funds to support programming and future expansion, and providing strong ties to the community.

=== Funding ===
In 2009, the museum had an annual budget of about $5 million, half of which came from an appropriation from the state of Washington. The budget did not include substantial in-kind support provided by the University of Washington as owner of the Burke property. Other sources of funding include interest from its endowment (10 percent), foundation grants and individual donations (27 percent), and admission fees and gift shop sales (13 percent).
