= C. B. Reynolds =

American politician

Member of the Washington House of Representatives for the 26th district
- In office 1895–1897

Personal details
- Born: April 12, 1846 Waterloo, New York, United States
- Died: November 11, 1915 (aged 69) Lewis County, Washington, United States
- Party: Republican

Charles B. Reynolds (April 12, 1846 – November 11, 1915) was an American politician in the state of Washington. He served in the Washington House of Representatives from 1895 to 1897.
