= David Kupfer =

American psychiatrist

David Jerome Kupfer (born February 14, 1941) earned both his B.A. and M.D. at Yale University. Kupfer received his research and clinical training at Yale New Haven Hospital and additionally at the National Institute of Mental Health (NIMH). He was appointed assistant professor of psychiatry at Yale University School of Medicine In 1969. In 1973, he joined the faculty at the University of Pittsburgh first as an associate professor of psychiatry and at the same time was appointed director of research and training at Western Psychiatric Institute and Clinic. In 1975 Kupfer was promoted to professor of psychiatry and ultimately became chairman of the department in 1983 and served in that role until 2009.Under his direction as chair of the department of psychiatry the University of Pittsburgh became one of the preeminent university-based psychiatric centers in the nation, as indexed by the amount of federal funding obtained for mental health research and the number and quality of publications.

Kupfer's research has focused on the causes, diagnosis, and treatment of a variety of mood disorders. Kupfer's bibliography includes more than 1000 articles, books and book chapters that examine: the causes of depression, the relationship between biomarkers and depression, and the treatment of recurrent depression. He has had a particular focus on studies of sleep disorders, their causes, measurement and their relationship to mood and anxiety disorders.

His early work focused on mostly on REM sleep and the relationship between the latency from sleep onset to the first episode of REM sleep (REM Latency) and depression. Later work included important findings about slow wave sleep and its changes with aging and relation to mood disorders. Another area of Kupfer’s specialty is the comorbidity of mood disorders with other psychiatric disorders and other medical disorders. Which has led to more integrated forms of treatment.

In the area of treatment research in mood disorders, in collaboration with Ellen Frank. He established the importance of maintenance treatment for recurrent depressive disorders and demonstrated that it led to reductions in the frequency of relapse and recurrence. He also helped to establish the efficacy of the combination of drug and psychotherapy in mood disordered patients. He has also been an important leader in the field of social zeitgebers and social rhythms and the extent to which disruptions in social rhythms might lead to disruptions in endogenous circadian rhythms and, in vulnerable individuals, to onset of mood episodes known as the social zeitgeber hypothesis of depression. He was part of the development of the Social Rhythm Metric (SRM), a tool that later was used to establish Interpersonal and Social Rhythm Therapy (IPSRT) for mood disorders.

He has accomplished this by promoting worldwide collaborations between clinical investigators in the basic sciences and clinical psychiatry with funding from the NIH and organizations such as the Mac Arthur foundation where he ran several research networks. He was particularly active in promoting the careers of young people and women scientists. Kupfer is also known as for his work as Chair of the American Psychiatric Association Task Force for the Fifth Edition of the Diagnostic and Statistical Manual of Mental Disorders (DSM-5) which is recognized world-wide as the definitive system by which psychiatry diagnoses are categorized.

Kupfer has been the recipient of numerous honors and awards including the A.E. Bennett Research Award (1975), the Anna-Monika Foundation Prize (1977), the Daniel H. Efron Award (1979), the Edward A. Strecker award, M.D. (1989), the William R. McAlpin, Jr., Award (1990), the 1993 American Psychiatric Association Award for Research in Psychiatry, the First Isaac Ray Decade of Excellence Award (1994), the Edward J. Sachar Award (1996), the 1996 Gerald Klerman Award (jointly with Ellen Frank), the Institute of Medicine's 1998 Rhoda and Bernard Sarnat International Prize in Mental Health, and the American Psychopathological Association's 1999 Joseph Zubin Award (jointly with Frank). He was elected to the Institute of Medicine of the National Academy of Sciences in 1990.

NIH National Library of Medicine Bibliography
