= Charles B. Reynolds Round Barn =

- U.S. National Register of Historic Places
- Location within Iowa Location within the United States
- Location: 2382 Harrison Ave. Doon, Iowa
- Coordinates: 43°18′10″N 96°9′21″W
- Area: less than one acre
- Built: 1924
- Built by: Charles B. Reynolds
- MPS: Iowa Round Barns: The Sixty Year Experiment TR
- NRHP reference No.: 99000737
- Added to NRHP: July 7, 1999

The Charles B. Reynolds Round Barn was a historic building located near Doon in rural Lyon County, Iowa, United States. It was built in the summer of 1904. In the early 1920s, the original conical roof was damaged due to a windstorm and replaced with a gambrel roof. The building was a true round barn and featured white horizontal siding, a two-pitch sectional roof and an octagon louvered cupola. The barn has been listed on the National Register of Historic Places since 1999. The barn was razed in September 2009.
