= American Association for Geriatric Psychiatry =

- Formation: 1978
- Tax ID no.: 52-1945946
- Legal status: 501(c)(3) nonprofit corporation
- Headquarters: Brentwood, TN, USA
- Fields: Geriatric psychiatry
- Members: less than 2,000 (2025)
- President: Elizabeth J. Santos, MD, MPH
- Publication: The American Journal of Geriatric Psychiatry
- Subsidiaries: Geriatric Mental Health Foundation
- Website: http://www.aagponline.org/

The American Association for Geriatric Psychiatry (AAGP), not-for-profit, 501(c)(3) organization, is a learned society of professionals that aims to improve the quality of life for the elderly population, promote a healthy aging process, and a raise a greater awareness of geriatric mental health issues.

The association has nearly 2,000 members, including psychiatrists and other health care professionals, across the United States, Canada, and abroad.

== History ==
The association was founded in 1978 by 11 professionals who were concerned about the issues that uniquely affect older adults' mental health and well-being.

=== Past presidents ===
The following persons have been president of the association:

- Sanford Finkel (1978-1981)
- Eric Pfeiffer (1981-1982)
- Alvin Levinson (1982-1984)
- Lissy Jarvik (1984-1985)
- Elliott M. Stein (1985-1987)
- Charles A. Shamoian (1987-1988)
- Lawrence Lazarus (1988-1989)
- George Grossberg (1989-1990)
- Jonathan Lieff (1990-1991)
- Barnett Meyers (1991-1992)
- Alan Siegal (1992-1994)
- Gary Gottlieb (1994-1995)
- Ira Katz (1995-1996)
- Hugh Hendrie (1996-1997)
- Jeffrey R. Foster (1997-1998)
- Dilip V. Jeste (1998-1999)
- Soo Borson (1999-2000)
- William E. Reichman (2000-2001)
- Stephen Bartels (2001-2002)
- Gary Kennedy (2002-2003)
- Joel E. Streim (2003-2004)
- Anand Kumar (2004-2005)
- Dan Blazer (2005-2006)
- Christopher C. Colenda (2006-2007)
- Gary S. Moak (2007-2008)
- Bruce G. Pollock (2008-2009)
- Charles F. Reynolds, III (2009-2010)
- Jeffrey M. Lyness (2010-2011)
- Allan A. Anderson (2011-2012)
- Paul D.S. Kirwin (2012-2013)
- David C. Steffens (2013-2014)
- Susan K. Schultz (2014-2015)
- Gary W. Small (2015-2016)
- Daniel D. Sewell (2016-2017)
- Iqbal Ahmed, MD (2017-2018)
- Melinda Lantz, MD (2018-2019)
- Rajesh R. Tampi, MD, MS (2019-2021)
- Brent P. Forester, MD, MSc (2020-2022)
- Marc E. Agronin, MD (2022-2023)
- Helen Lavretsky, MD, MS (2023-2024)
- Sandra Swantek, MD (2024-2025)

== Public outreach ==
=== Notable programs ===
In 2005, three members from the board of directors at the Geriatric Mental Health Foundation participated as delegates at the White House Conference on Aging. At this conference, they recommended many resolutions such as: the reform and enhancement of Medicaid and Medicare programs, improved mental health care, particularly for older adults, adequate transportation methods for older adults, and the re-authorization of the Older Americans Act.

== Publications ==
The association publishes The American Journal of Geriatric Psychiatry According to the Journal Citation Reports, the journal has a 2013 impact factor of 3.519.

=== Notable articles ===
The journal has published the following notable articles:

- Localization of Neurofibrillary Tangles and Beta-Amyloid Plaques in the Brains of Living Patients with Alzheimer Disease. Shoghi-Jadid, K., Small, G. W., Agdeppa, E. D., Kepe, V., Ercoli, L. M., Siddarth, P., Read, S., Satyamurthy, N., Petric, A., Huang, S., & Barrio, J. R. (2002)
- Efficacy and Adverse Effects of Atypical Antipsychotics for Dementia: Meta-analysis of Randomized, Placebo-Controlled Trials. Schneider, L. S., Dagerman, K., & Insel, P. S. (2006).
- Preserved Cognition in Patients with Early Alzheimer Disease and Amnestic Mild Cognitive Impairment During Treatment with Rosiglitazone: A Preliminary Study. Watson, G. S., Cholerton, B. A., Reger, M. A., Baker, L. D., Plymate, S. R., Asthana, S., Fishel, M. A., Kulstad, J. J., Green, P. S., Cook, D. G., Kahn, S. E., Keeling, M. L., & Craft, S. (2005).
