= Augment (app) =

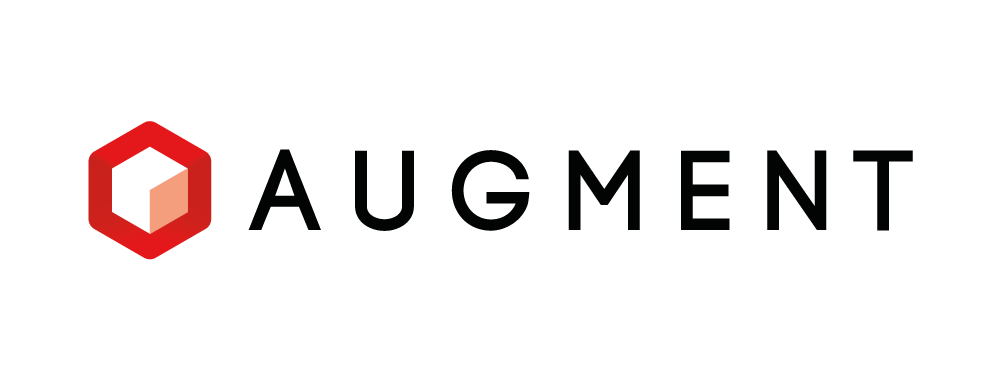
- Founder: Jean-Francois Chianetta, Mickaël Jordan, Cyril Champier
- Location: Paris (France), New York (US), Orlando (US)
- Products: Augment app for iOS/Android, Augment Manager, Augment Desktop, Augmented reality SDK.
- Website: http://www.augment.com/

Augment is an augmented reality SaaS platform that allows users to visualize their products in 3D in real environment and in real-time through tablets or smartphones. The software can be used for retail, e-commerce, architecture, and other purposes.

Augment created a mobile app of the same name, used to visualize 3D models in augmented reality and a web application called Augment Manager for 3D content management. The company is based in Paris, France, and was founded in October 2011 by Jean-François Chianetta, Cyril Champier, and Mickaël Jordan. In March 2016, Augment announced €3 million in its series-A round from Salesforce Ventures, which bringing the total funding since launch to $4.7 million.

Augment lets businesses and 3D professionals visualize projects in their actual size and environment, on iPhone, iPad, and Android, using the power of augmented reality. Users can print the Augment tracker or create their own tracker to place the 3D models in space and at scale in real time. Common uses of the technology include product presentations, interactive print campaigns and e-Commerce product visualization.

Augment has just released its augmented reality SDK solutions for retail and augmented commerce. The SDK solutions, available for both native mobile app and web integrations, allow companies to embed augmented reality product visualization in their existing eCommerce platforms.

== Technology ==
Augment uses the following 3D technologies:

- Vuforia Augmented Reality SDK
- OpenGL

== Customer cases ==
Companies such as Coca-Cola, Siemens, Nokia, Nestle, and Boeing are using Augment's solutions.

== History ==
Augment was first created by Jean-François Chianetta in October 2011. Chianetta later teamed up with Cyril Champier and Mickaël Jordan for further development. The co-founding team was among the 12 startups of Season 3 of French accelerator Le Camping. The team raised one million euros (US$1,300,000) in April 2013 and moved its office to Paris. In March 2016, Augment raised US$3M Series A funding from Salesforce and other investors.

In 2013, Augment's first service, Boost Business Catalog, was made available to help businesses catalogue and display their product models. Customers can rotate the images in 3D and view augmented content before deciding what to buy.

== Awards ==
- "Best Innovation" at Ecommerce Mag Trophy 2013
