= Charlie Reynolds (pitcher) =

American baseball player (1857–1913)

- Pitcher
- Born: June 29, 1855; Philadelphia, Pennsylvania
- Died: May 1, 1913 (aged 55); Buffalo, New York
- Batted: Unknown Threw: Unknown

MLB debut
- May 18, 1882, for the Philadelphia Athletics

Last MLB appearance
- May 19, 1882, for the Philadelphia Athletics

MLB statistics
- Win–loss record: 1–1
- Earned run average: 5.25
- Strikeouts: 4
- Stats at Baseball Reference

Teams
- Philadelphia Athletics (1882)

Thomas Hart Reynolds (July 31, 1857 – May 1, 1913) was a Major League Baseball pitcher who started two games in 1882 with the Philadelphia Athletics.

He was born in Philadelphia, Pennsylvania and died in Buffalo, New York.
