= Synaptic augmentation =

Form of short term synaptic plasticity

Augmentation is one of four components of short-term synaptic plasticity that increases the probability of releasing synaptic vesicles during and after repetitive stimulation such that

$$A(t) = [{\rm Transmitter Release}(t)/ {\rm Transmitter Release} (0)] - 1,$$

when all the other components of enhancement and depression are zero, where $A$ is augmentation at time $t$ and 0 refers to the baseline response to a single stimulus. The increase in the number of synaptic vesicles that release their transmitter leads to enhancement of the post synaptic response. Augmentation can be differentiated from the other components of enhancement by its kinetics of decay and by pharmacology. Augmentation selectively decays with a time constant of about 7 seconds and its magnitude is enhanced in the presence of barium. All four components are thought to be associated with or triggered by increases in internal calcium ions that build up and decay during repetitive stimulation.

During a train of impulses the enhancement of synaptic strength due to the underlying component $A^*$ that gives rise to augmentation can be described by

$$\frac{d A^*}{d t} = J(t)a^* - k_{A^*}A^*$$

where $J(t)$ is the unit impulse function at the time of stimulation, $a^*$ is the incremental increase in $A^*$ with each impulse, and $k_{A^*}$ is the rate constant for the loss of $A^*$. During a stimulus train the magnitude of augmentation added by each impulse, a*, can increase during the train such that

$$a^* = a^*_0 Z^{S T}$$

where $a^*_0$ is the increment added by the first impulse of the train, $Z$ is a constant that determines the increase in $a^*$ with each impulse, $S$ is the stimulation rate, and $T$ is the duration of stimulation.

Augmentation is differentiated from the three other components of enhancement by its time constant of decay. This is shown in Table 1 where the first and second components of facilitation, F1 and F2, decay with time constants of about 50 and 300 ms, and potentiation, P, decays with a time constant than ranges from tens of seconds to minutes depending on the duration of stimulation. Also included in the table are two components of depression D1 and D2, along with their associated decay time constants of recovery decay back to normal. Depression at some synapses may arise from depletion of synaptic vesicles available for release. Depression of synaptic vesicle release may mask augmentation because of overlapping time courses. Also included in the table is the fraction change in transmitter release arising from one impulse. A magnitude of 0.8 would increase transmitter release 80%.

	Decay constant	Magnitude/Impulse
F1	50 ms	0.8
F2	300 ms	0.12
A	7 s	0.01^{†}
P	20 s to minutes^{‡}	0.01
D1	5 to 6 s	-0.15
D2	minutes	-0.001

^{†}The magnitude of augmentation added by each impulse can increase during the train. ^{‡}The time constant of P can increase with repetitive stimulation.

The balance between various components of enhancement and depression at the mammalian synapse is affected by temperature so that maintenance of the components of enhancement is greatly reduced at temperatures lower than physiological. During repetitive stimulation at 23 °C components of depression dominate synaptic release, whereas at 33–38 °C synaptic strength increases due to a shift towards components of enhancement.
