= C8H18N4O2 =

The molecular formula C_{8}H_{18}N_{4}O_{2} (molar mass: 202.25 g/mol) may refer to:

- L-Arginine ethyl ester
- Asymmetric dimethylarginine (ADMA)
- Symmetric dimethylarginine (SDMA)
