= NAPA (gene) =

Protein-coding gene in the species Homo sapiens

Identifiers
- Aliases: NAPA, SNSF attachment protein alpha
- External IDs: OMIM: 603215; MGI: 104563; HomoloGene: 2839; GeneCards: NAPA; OMA:NAPA - orthologs

Gene location (Human)
Chr.	Chromosome 19 (human)
Band	19q13.32-q13.33	Start	47,487,637 bp
Band	19q13.32-q13.33	End	47,515,091 bp

Gene location (Mouse)
Chr.	Chromosome 7 (mouse)
Band	7 A2|7 8.74 cM	Start	16,098,458 bp
Band	7 A2|7 8.74 cM	End	16,117,975 bp
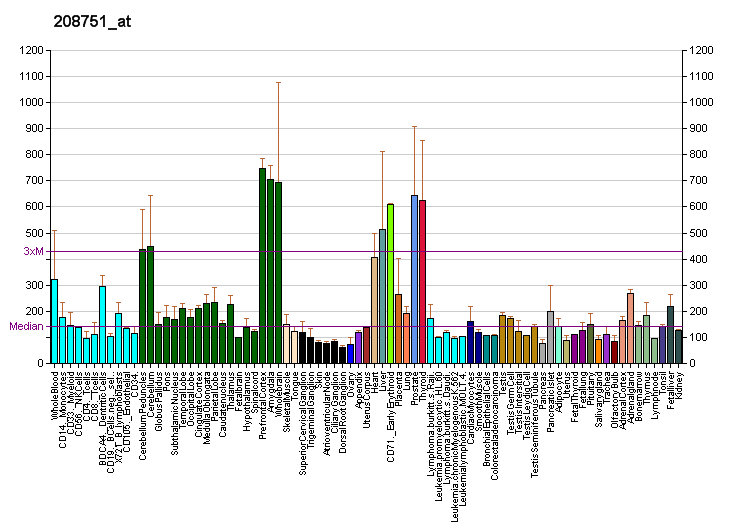

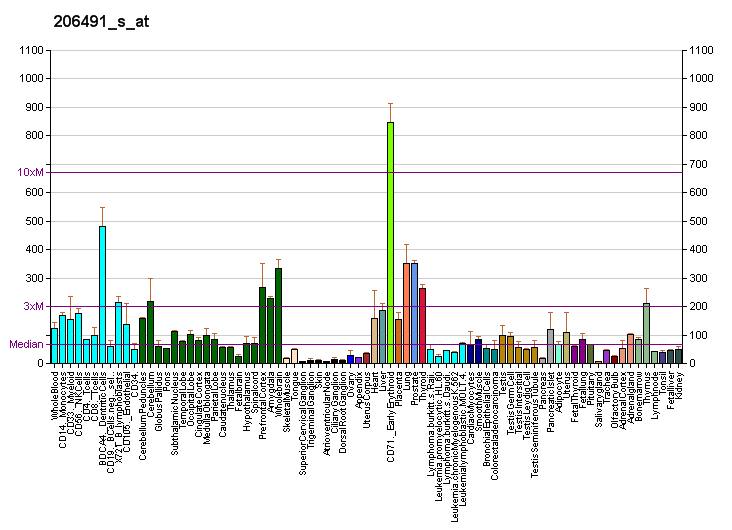
RNA expression pattern
Bgee	Human / Mouse (ortholog); Top expressed in: right hemisphere of cerebellum; primary visual cortex; superior frontal gyrus; prefrontal cortex; right frontal lobe; Brodmann area 9; right adrenal cortex; left adrenal cortex; pituitary gland; anterior cingulate cortex / Top expressed in: dentate gyrus of hippocampal formation granule cell; superior frontal gyrus; neural layer of retina; primary visual cortex; motor neuron; muscle of thigh; cerebellar cortex; CA3 field; yolk sac; lip; More reference expression data
BioGPS	More reference expression data
Gene ontology
Molecular function	soluble NSF attachment protein activity; protein binding; syntaxin binding; SNARE binding; protein-containing complex binding
Cellular component	cytosol; membrane; vacuolar membrane; myelin sheath; terminal bouton; SNARE complex; synaptobrevin 2-SNAP-25-syntaxin-1a complex; extracellular exosome; Golgi membrane; plasma membrane; presynapse; postsynapse; glutamatergic synapse
Biological process	SNARE complex disassembly; synaptic transmission, glutamatergic; membrane fusion; endoplasmic reticulum to Golgi vesicle-mediated transport; brain development; COPII vesicle coating; apical protein localization; neuron differentiation; protein transport; intracellular protein transport; intra-Golgi vesicle-mediated transport; vesicle-mediated transport; regulation of synaptic vesicle priming; retrograde vesicle-mediated transport, Golgi to endoplasmic reticulum; positive regulation of ATP-dependent activity; transport; synaptic vesicle priming; protein-containing complex disassembly
Sources:Amigo / QuickGO
Orthologs
Species	Human	Mouse
Entrez	8775	108124
Ensembl	ENSG00000105402	ENSMUSG00000006024
UniProt	P54920	Q9DB05
RefSeq (mRNA)	NM_003827	NM_025898
RefSeq (protein)	NP_003818	NP_080174
Location (UCSC)	Chr 19: 47.49 – 47.52 Mb	Chr 7: 16.1 – 16.12 Mb
PubMed search
- Wikidata
View/Edit Human	View/Edit Mouse

N-ethylmaleimide-sensitive factor Attachment Protein Alpha, also known as SNAP-α, is a SNAP protein that is involved in the intra-cellular trafficking and fusing of vesicles to target membranes in cells.

== Function ==
The 'SNARE hypothesis' is a model explaining the process of docking and fusion of vesicles to their target membranes. According to this model, membrane proteins from the vesicle (v-SNAREs) and proteins from the target membrane (t-SNAREs) govern the specificity of vesicle targeting and docking through mutual recognition.

Once the 2 classes of SNAREs bind to each other, they form a complex that recruits the general elements of the fusion apparatus, namely NSF (N-ethylmaleimide-sensitive factor) and SNAPs (soluble NSF-attachment proteins), to the site of membrane fusion, thereby forming the 20S fusion complex.

Alpha- and gamma-SNAP are found in a wide range of tissues and act synergistically in intra-Golgi transport. The sequence of the predicted 295-amino acid human protein encoded by NAPA shares 37%, 60%, and 67% identity with the sequences of yeast, Drosophila, and squid alpha-SNAP, respectively. Platelets contain some of the same proteins, including NSF, p115/TAP, alpha-SNAP (this protein), gamma-SNAP, and the t-SNAREs syntaxin-2 and syntaxin-4, that are used in many vesicular transport processes in other cell types. Platelet exocytosis uses a molecular mechanism similar to that used by other secretory cells, such as neurons, although the proteins used by the platelet and their modes of regulation may be quite different.

== Clinical significance ==
NAPA is abnormally expressed in fetuses of both IVF and ICSI, which may contribute to the increased risk of birth defects in these methods of assisted reproductive technology (ART).

== Interactions ==
NAPA has been shown to interact with:

- NSF,
- SNAP23,
- STX1A,
- STX4,
- STX5.
- ORAI1, STIM1.
