= GTPBP3 =

Protein-coding gene in the species Homo sapiens

Identifiers
- Aliases: GTPBP3, GTPBG3, MSS1, MTGP1, THDF1, COXPD23, GTP binding protein 3 (mitochondrial), GTP binding protein 3, mitochondrial
- External IDs: OMIM: 608536; MGI: 1917609; HomoloGene: 6600; GeneCards: GTPBP3; OMA:GTPBP3 - orthologs

Gene location (Human)
Chr.	Chromosome 19 (human)
Band	19p13.11	Start	17,334,920 bp
Band	19p13.11	End	17,342,731 bp

Gene location (Mouse)
Chr.	Chromosome 8 (mouse)
Band	8|8 B3.3	Start	71,488,103 bp
Band	8|8 B3.3	End	71,499,583 bp
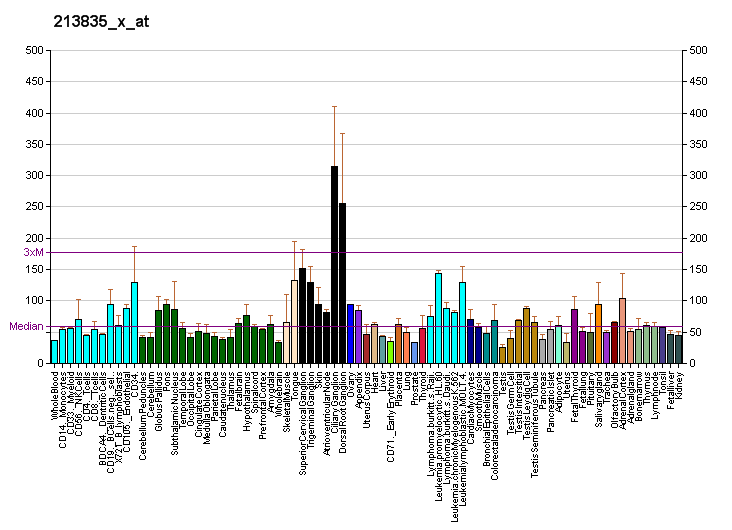
RNA expression pattern
Bgee	Human / Mouse (ortholog); Top expressed in: buccal mucosa cell; tendon of biceps brachii; right adrenal gland; right adrenal cortex; left adrenal cortex; right uterine tube; skin of leg; skin of abdomen; body of pancreas; granulocyte / Top expressed in: otic vesicle; Rostral migratory stream; epiblast; muscle of thigh; ventricular zone; superior frontal gyrus; granulocyte; primary visual cortex; dentate gyrus of hippocampal formation granule cell; embryo; More reference expression data
BioGPS	More reference expression data
Gene ontology
Molecular function	nucleotide binding; protein binding; GTPase activity; GTP binding
Cellular component	intracellular anatomical structure; nucleus; mitochondrion; cytoplasm
Biological process	tRNA modification; tRNA processing; tRNA wobble uridine modification; tRNA methylation; embryonic organ development
Sources:Amigo / QuickGO
Orthologs
Species	Human	Mouse
Entrez	84705	70359
Ensembl	ENSG00000130299	ENSMUSG00000007610
UniProt	Q969Y2	Q923K4
RefSeq (mRNA)	NM_133644; NM_001128855; NM_001195422; NM_032620	NM_032544
RefSeq (protein)	NP_001122327; NP_001182351; NP_116009; NP_598399	NP_115933
Location (UCSC)	Chr 19: 17.33 – 17.34 Mb	Chr 8: 71.49 – 71.5 Mb
PubMed search
- Wikidata
View/Edit Human	View/Edit Mouse

tRNA modification GTPase GTPBP3, mitochondrial is an enzyme that in human is encoded by the GTPBP3 gene on chromosome 19.

The GTPBP3 gene encodes a GTP-binding protein that is evolutionarily conserved from bacteria to mammals and which is localized to the mitochondrion and functions in tRNA modification. At least two major isoforms due to alternative splicing are known In addition, a polymorphism on valine 250 is known and may influence aminoglydoside-induced deafness.

== Structure ==
The GTPBP3 gene contains 10 exons, and encodes a ~44 kDa GTP-binding protein that is evolutionarily conserved from bacteria to mammals. The N-terminal domain of mitochondrial tRNA modification GTPase mediates the dimerization of the protein in a potassium-independent manner, which is thought to be related to the construction of the binding site for the one-carbon-unit donor in its tRNA modification reaction function.

== Function ==
Mitochondrial tRNA modification GTPase is thought to catalyze the formation of 5-taurinomethyluridine (τm(5)U) in the anticodon wobble position of five mitochondrial tRNA. The gene was first discovered yeast where the mutation of the yeast homolog of human GTPBP3, MSS1, is found to elicit respiratory defect in yeast only when the mitochondrial 155 rRNA P(R)454 is present. The latter is equivalent to the human 12 rRNA A1555G mutation which has been found to associate with deafness. Hence GTPBP3 and its yeast homolog function in modification of mitochondrial function. In human, GTPBP3 is ubiquitously expressed in multiple tissues in multiple transcripts. As a tRNA modification enzyme, it is thought to function to modify codon-anticodon interaction, which is consistent with its modification of the severity of phenotypes in 12S rRNA A1555G mutation.

== Clinical Significance ==
Mutations in GTPBP3 are known to cause hypertrophic cardiomyopathy and mitochondrial defects. Individuals with homozygous or compound heterozygous mutations in GTPBP3 present with combined deficiency of respiratory chain complexes in skeletal muscle, which require mitochondrial translation of mitochondrial-encoded complex subunits to assemble. GTPBP3 mutations cause severe mitochondrial translation defect. The majority of characterized subjects presented with lactic acidosis and hypertrophic cardiomyopathy.

The valine 250 polymorphisms on GTPBP3 is associated with severity of aminoglycoside-induced deafness in human, a disease associated with homoplasmic A1555G mutation in the mitochondrial-encoded 12S rRNA and is characterized by deafness, varying from profond congenital hearing loss to normal hearing.
