= GOSR2-related progressive myoclonus ataxia =

- Other names: EPM6, PME type 6, Progressive myoclonic epilepsy type 6, North Sea progressive myoclonus epilepsy, Progressive myoclonus epilepsy type 6
- Specialty: Medical genetics
- Symptoms: Myoclonic epilepsy with progressive ataxia
- Usual onset: Early
- Duration: Lifelong
- Causes: Mutation in GOSR2
- Diagnostic method: Genetic testing
- Treatment: Physical therapy
- Frequency: very rare, only 12 cases have been described in medical literature

GOSR2-related progressive myoclonus ataxia, also known as Progressive myoclonic epilepsy type 6, is a rare genetic type of progressive myoclonus ataxia which is characterized by progressive myoclonic epilepsy with an early onset which is associated with generalized tonic-clonic seizures, petit mal seizures, and drop attacks, variable degrees of scoliosis, areflexia, high levels of creatine kinase serum, and late-onset cognitive decline.

According to OMIM, only 12 cases have been described in medical literature.

== Symptoms ==
EPM6 is classically characterised by first beginning motor delay, decreased muscle tone, gait issues, absent reflexes. At around age 4, patients usually develop ataxia; later (around age 6), they develop myoclonus. Myoclonus is more prominient in upper extremity than in lower, also they can experience myoclonus of tongue and around the mouth. Before age 20, patients might also develop epileptic seizures, also during the first decade, patients experience dysarthric speech; later, around the second/third decade, some patients experience dysphagia. Scoliosis (abnormal curvature of spine) can be seen in patients before first/second decade, also most of the patients became wheelchair-bound (around at the age 13). Increased creatine kinase levels can be seen, in addition patients usually have preserved cognition until late course of the disorder.

== Diagnosis ==
PME6 can be suspected by symptoms and confirmed by genetic testing.

== Cause ==
It is caused by autosomal recessive loss of function mutations in the GOSR2 gene, in chromosome 17. Most patients share the common mutation, specifically p.Gly144Trp. Rarely patients can present with congenital muscular dystrophy and PME at the same time.

== Pathophysiology ==
GOSR2 is a protein that is classified as a t-SNARE and includes SNARE domain which is important for vesicle fusion; in EPM6, GOSR2 function is compromised. In Drosophila model, GOSR2 mutation might cause deficiency in dendritic growth and disrupts evoked and spontaneous release of neurotransmitter.

== Treatment ==
Treatment is only symptomatic.

== See also ==
- Progressive myoclonic epilepsy
