= Christine A. Hrycyna =

Professor of biochemistry at Purdue University

Christine Hrycyna
- Education: Middlebury College; University of California, Los Angeles
- Known for: Multi-drug resistance
- Scientific career
- Workplaces: National Cancer Institute; Jane Coffin Childs Memorial Fund for Medical Research; Purdue University
- Website: Hrycyna Group Website

Christine A. Hrycyna is a professor of biochemistry at Purdue University. She studies multi-drug resistance in human cancer, which usually occurs due to over expression of the MDR1 gene.

== Early life and education ==
Hrycyna studied at Middlebury College and graduated in 1988. She was a graduate student at the University of California, Los Angeles, and earned her doctorate in 1993. She worked in Steven Clarke's laboratory on protein modifications. Hrycyna was a postdoctoral fellow at The Jane Coffin Childs Memorial Fund for Medical Research and the National Cancer Institute.

== Research and career ==
Hrcyna became Dean of UC San Diego's School of Physical Sciences in 2023 and was appointed to the role of Executive Vice President (EVC) for Academic Affairs in August 2026. Hrycyna previously worked at Purdue University, which she joined as an assistant professor in 2000. Multidrug resistance cancer often arises due to over expression of an energy-dependent multi-drug efflux pump, the multi-drug transporter P-glycoprotein. Whilst it is understood that P-glycoproteins are important in the movement of pharmacological agents, their mechanism as a drug efflux pump is unclear. She looked at the mechanism of the efflux pump and how it functions in normal and cancerous cells. P-glycoproteins can be recognised by several different substrates, but their affinity is reduced during a catalytic transfer state. The MDR1 gene results in expression of a P-glycoprotein and related drug transporter MXR1, which are involved in mitoxantrone resistance. She found that amino acid 483, which is present in MXR/BCRP/ABCP gene, changes when the gene is over-expressed. Unfortunately, cancers treated with a variety of anti-cancer drugs can develop resistance to other cytotoxic agents.

Drug transporters like MXR1 and P-glycoprotein are part of the ATP-binding cassette transporter group. Hrycyna studies the cellular function of ABC-transporters and how they have impact human disease. She has worked on new drugs for the treatment of HIV, which work by blocking the action of ZMPSTE24. Hrycyna studies the post-translational modification of eukaryotic proteins, including the small G proteins. Eukaryotic proteins undergo three modifications, including isoprenylation, proteolysis and methylesterification, and are synthesised with the C-terminal sequence Cys-Xaa-Xaa-Xaa.

In 2011 Hrycyna wrote the book Protein Prenylation.

=== Academic service ===
Hrcyna became Dean of UC San Diego's School of Physical Sciences in 2023 and was appointed to the role of Executive Vice President (EVC) for Academic Affairs in August 2026. She was the first female department head of the Purdue chemistry department, a position she has held since 2017. She has been awarded the Purdue University Department of Chemistry Arthur E. Kelley Undergraduate Award for Excellence in Teaching three times. She has been involved with the curriculum review for the Department of Chemistry, recreating their chemistry sequence for life sciences majors. In 2018 Hrycyna was named as one of the Purdue University 150th Anniversary Professors.

=== Awards and honours ===
Her awards and honours include:

- 2007 Outstanding Undergraduate Teaching Award in Memory of Charles B. Murphy
- 2006 Teaching for Tomorrow Award
