= NAPG =

Protein-coding gene in the species Homo sapiens

Identifiers
- Aliases: NAPG, GAMMASNAP, NSF attachment protein gamma
- External IDs: OMIM: 603216; MGI: 104561; HomoloGene: 2838; GeneCards: NAPG; OMA:NAPG - orthologs

Gene location (Human)
Chr.	Chromosome 18 (human)
Band	18p11.22	Start	10,525,905 bp
Band	18p11.22	End	10,552,764 bp

Gene location (Mouse)
Chr.	Chromosome 18 (mouse)
Band	18|18 E1	Start	63,110,902 bp
Band	18|18 E1	End	63,132,521 bp
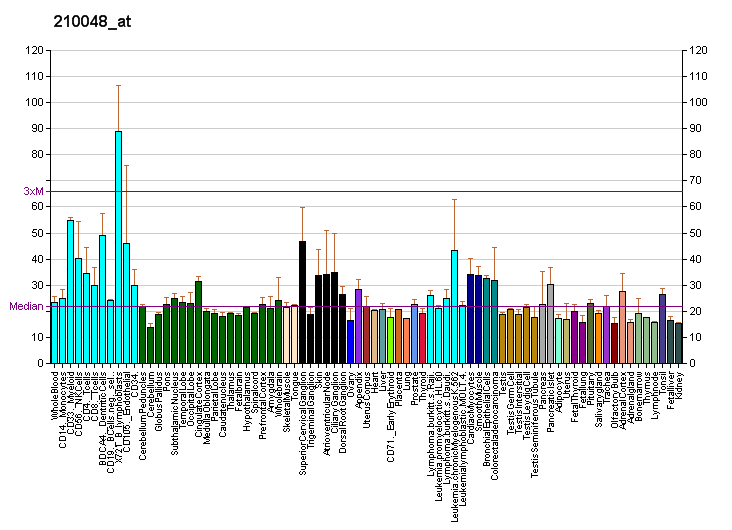
RNA expression pattern
Bgee	Human / Mouse (ortholog); Top expressed in: endothelial cell; pons; pars compacta; Brodmann area 23; islet of Langerhans; C1 segment; lateral nuclear group of thalamus; middle temporal gyrus; dorsolateral prefrontal cortex; Brodmann area 9 / Top expressed in: subiculum; pontine nuclei; piriform cortex; central gray substance of midbrain; medial dorsal nucleus; primary motor cortex; inferior colliculi; subdivision of hippocampus; Region I of hippocampus proper; habenula; More reference expression data
BioGPS	More reference expression data
Gene ontology
Molecular function	syntaxin binding; protein binding; soluble NSF attachment protein activity
Cellular component	myelin sheath; lysosomal membrane; SNARE complex; extracellular exosome; membrane; mitochondrion; vacuolar membrane; synapse
Biological process	protein transport; protein stabilization; membrane fusion; intracellular protein transport; intra-Golgi vesicle-mediated transport; vesicle-mediated transport; transport; protein-containing complex assembly
Sources:Amigo / QuickGO
Orthologs
Species	Human	Mouse
Entrez	8774	108123
Ensembl	ENSG00000134265	ENSMUSG00000024581
UniProt	Q99747	Q9CWZ7
RefSeq (mRNA)	NM_003826	NM_028017
RefSeq (protein)	NP_003817	NP_082293
Location (UCSC)	Chr 18: 10.53 – 10.55 Mb	Chr 18: 63.11 – 63.13 Mb
PubMed search
- Wikidata
View/Edit Human	View/Edit Mouse

Gamma-soluble NSF attachment protein is a SNAP protein that in humans is encoded by the NAPG gene.

== Function ==
NSF and SNAPs (NSF attachment proteins) are general elements of the cellular membrane transport apparatus. The sequence of the predicted 312-amino acid human protein encoded by NAPG is 95% identical to that of bovine gamma-SNAP. NAPG mediates platelet exocytosis and controls the membrane fusion events of this process.
