= SDMA =

SDMA may refer to:

- SDMA (drug), related to MDMA (ecstasy)
- Symmetric dimethylarginine
- Space-division multiple access, a channel access method used in communication
- Soft direct memory access, a type of direct memory access (DMA) specific to Xilinx's Multi-Port Memory Controller (MPMC)
- System direct memory access, a Linux kernel module and userspace library for accessing direct memory access (DMA) using some processors made by Texas Instruments
