= STX5 =

Protein-coding gene in the species Homo sapiens

Identifiers
- Aliases: STX5, SED5, STX5A, syntaxin 5
- External IDs: OMIM: 603189; MGI: 1928483; GeneCards: STX5
Available structures
PDB	Ortholog search: PDBe RCSB
PDB	List of PDB id codes 3EFO

Gene location (Human)
Chr.	Chromosome 11 (human)
Band	11q12.3	Start	62,806,860 bp
Band	11q12.3	End	62,832,051 bp

Gene location (Mouse)
Chr.	Chromosome 19 (mouse)
Band	19|19 A	Start	8,718,777 bp
Band	19|19 A	End	8,733,433 bp
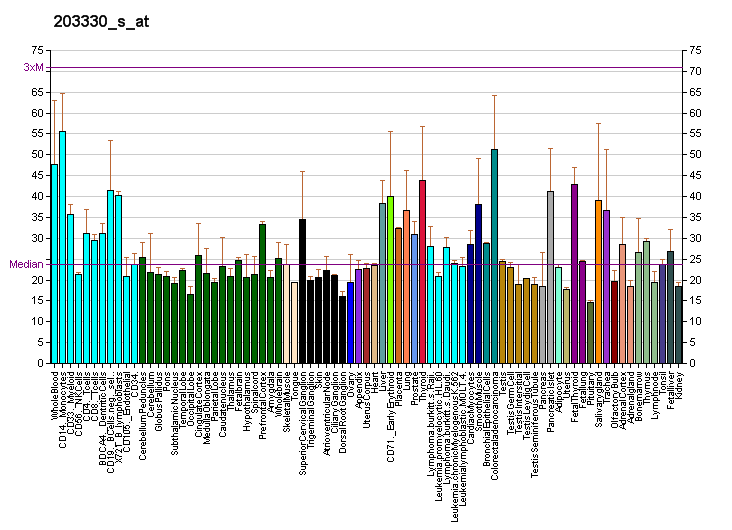
RNA expression pattern
Bgee	Human / Mouse (ortholog); Top expressed in: bone marrow cell; blood; granulocyte; body of pancreas; olfactory zone of nasal mucosa; canal of the cervix; ectocervix; left ovary; left lobe of thyroid gland; prostate / Top expressed in: primary oocyte; internal carotid artery; external carotid artery; fossa; condyle; secondary oocyte; lacrimal gland; vas deferens; pituitary gland; islet of Langerhans; More reference expression data
BioGPS	More reference expression data
Gene ontology
Molecular function	protein N-terminus binding; protein binding; SNARE binding; SNAP receptor activity; cadherin binding
Cellular component	integral component of membrane; vesicle; endoplasmic reticulum membrane; membrane; endoplasmic reticulum; ER to Golgi transport vesicle membrane; SNARE complex; endoplasmic reticulum-Golgi intermediate compartment membrane; Golgi apparatus; cytosol; Golgi membrane; endomembrane system
Biological process	positive regulation of protein catabolic process; vesicle fusion with Golgi apparatus; early endosome to Golgi transport; vesicle docking; COPII vesicle coating; regulation of Golgi organization; retrograde transport, endosome to Golgi; Golgi disassembly; vesicle fusion; vesicle-mediated transport; intracellular protein transport; endoplasmic reticulum to Golgi vesicle-mediated transport
Sources:Amigo / QuickGO
Orthologs
Databases	NCBI: entry; OMA: entry
Species	Human	Mouse
Entrez	6811	56389
Ensembl	ENSG00000162236	ENSMUSG00000010110
UniProt	Q13190	Q8K1E0
RefSeq (mRNA)	NM_001244666; NM_003164; NM_001330294	NM_001167799; NM_019829
RefSeq (protein)	NP_001231595; NP_001317223; NP_003155	NP_001161271; NP_062803
Location (UCSC)	Chr 11: 62.81 – 62.83 Mb	Chr 19: 8.72 – 8.73 Mb
PubMed search
- Wikidata
View/Edit Human	View/Edit Mouse

Syntaxin-5 is a protein that in humans is encoded by the STX5 gene.

== Interactions ==
STX5 has been shown to interact with:

- BET1L,
- GOSR1,
- GOSR2,
- NAPA,
- USO1, and
- SEC22B.
