= BET1L =

Protein-coding gene in the species Homo sapiens

Identifiers
- Aliases: BET1L, BET1L1, GOLIM3, GS15, HSPC197, Bet1 golgi vesicular membrane trafficking protein like
- External IDs: OMIM: 615417; MGI: 1913128; HomoloGene: 10293; GeneCards: BET1L; OMA:BET1L - orthologs

Gene location (Human)
Chr.	Chromosome 11 (human)
Band	11p15.5	Start	167,784 bp
Band	11p15.5	End	207,399 bp

Gene location (Mouse)
Chr.	Chromosome 7 (mouse)
Band	7|7 F4	Start	140,433,307 bp
Band	7|7 F4	End	140,437,490 bp
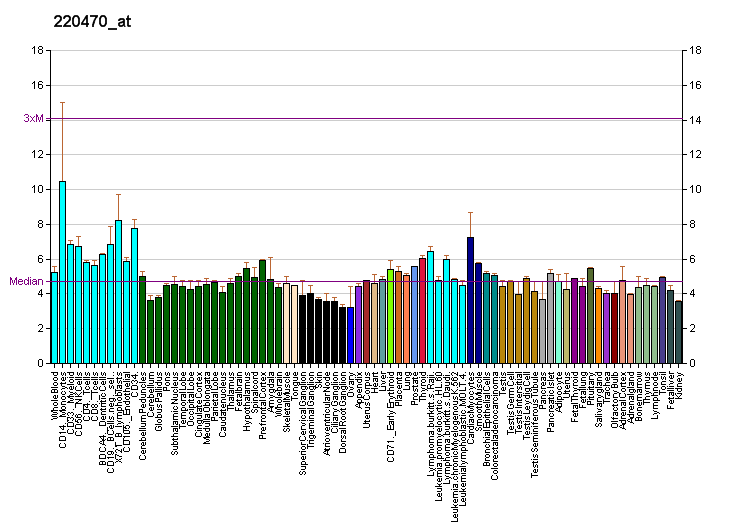
RNA expression pattern
Bgee	Human / Mouse (ortholog); Top expressed in: body of pancreas; anterior pituitary; left ovary; right coronary artery; Descending thoracic aorta; body of stomach; gastric mucosa; canal of the cervix; ascending aorta; stromal cell of endometrium / Top expressed in: dentate gyrus of hippocampal formation granule cell; molar; parotid gland; granulocyte; seminal vesicula; calvaria; spermatocyte; motor neuron; crypt of lieberkuhn of small intestine; decidua; More reference expression data
BioGPS	More reference expression data
Gene ontology
Molecular function	SNAP receptor activity
Cellular component	integral component of membrane; Golgi membrane; endosome; Golgi apparatus; SNARE complex; membrane; cytosol; Golgi trans cisterna; Golgi stack; integral component of Golgi membrane
Biological process	protein transport; endoplasmic reticulum to Golgi vesicle-mediated transport; retrograde transport, endosome to Golgi; regulation of retrograde vesicle-mediated transport, Golgi to ER; membrane fusion; transport
Sources:Amigo / QuickGO
Orthologs
Species	Human	Mouse
Entrez	51272	54399
Ensembl	ENSG00000177951	ENSMUSG00000025484
UniProt	Q9NYM9	O35153
RefSeq (mRNA)	NM_016526; NM_001098787; NM_016465	NM_018742
RefSeq (protein)	NP_001092257; NP_057610	NP_061212
Location (UCSC)	Chr 11: 0.17 – 0.21 Mb	Chr 7: 140.43 – 140.44 Mb
PubMed search
- Wikidata
View/Edit Human	View/Edit Mouse

BET1-like protein is a protein that in humans is encoded by the BET1L gene.

== Interactions ==
BET1L has been shown to interact with:

- GOSR1,
- STX5, and
- YKT6.
