= SCFD1 =

Protein-coding gene in the species Homo sapiens

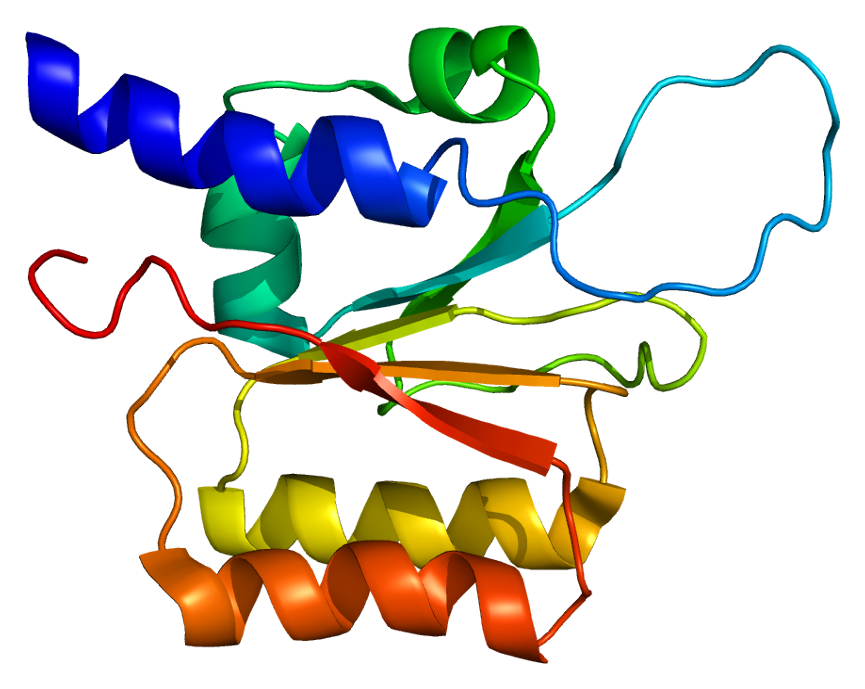

Identifiers
- Aliases: SCFD1, C14orf163, RA410, SLY1, SLY1P, STXBP1L2, sec1 family domain containing 1
- External IDs: OMIM: 618207; MGI: 1924233; GeneCards: SCFD1

Gene location (Human)
Chr.	Chromosome 14 (human)
Band	14q12	Start	30,622,291 bp
Band	14q12	End	30,737,694 bp

Gene location (Mouse)
Chr.	Chromosome 12 (mouse)
Band	12|12 B3	Start	51,424,293 bp
Band	12|12 B3	End	51,496,884 bp
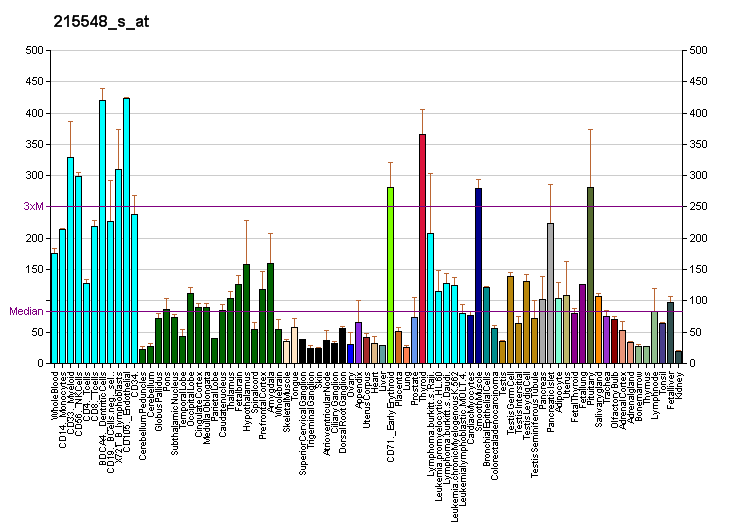
RNA expression pattern
Bgee	Human / Mouse (ortholog); Top expressed in: Achilles tendon; body of pancreas; anterior pituitary; parotid gland; corpus epididymis; oral cavity; mucosa of paranasal sinus; islet of Langerhans; biceps brachii; bone marrow cell / Top expressed in: seminal vesicula; parotid gland; islet of Langerhans; calvaria; dermis; lobe of prostate; efferent ductule; olfactory epithelium; pituitary gland; Gonadal ridge; More reference expression data
BioGPS	More reference expression data
Gene ontology
Molecular function	protein N-terminus binding; protein binding; syntaxin binding; protein-containing complex binding
Cellular component	cytoplasm; cytosol; Golgi apparatus; endoplasmic reticulum membrane; membrane; cis-Golgi network; plasma membrane; Golgi transport complex; Golgi-associated vesicle; Golgi cisterna membrane; endoplasmic reticulum
Biological process	negative regulation of autophagosome assembly; regulation of ER to Golgi vesicle-mediated transport; response to hypoxia; regulation of protein transport; retrograde vesicle-mediated transport, Golgi to endoplasmic reticulum; toxin transport; post-Golgi vesicle-mediated transport; vesicle docking involved in exocytosis; COPII vesicle coating; cell morphogenesis; protein transport; response to toxic substance; vesicle-mediated transport
Sources:Amigo / QuickGO
Orthologs
Databases	NCBI: entry; OMA: entry
Species	Human	Mouse
Entrez	23256	76983
Ensembl	ENSG00000092108	ENSMUSG00000020952
UniProt	Q8WVM8	Q8BRF7
RefSeq (mRNA)	NM_001257376; NM_001283031; NM_001283032; NM_001283033; NM_016106 NM_182835	NM_029825; NM_001306178
RefSeq (protein)	NP_001244305; NP_001269960; NP_001269961; NP_001269962; NP_057190 NP_878255	NP_001293107; NP_084101
Location (UCSC)	Chr 14: 30.62 – 30.74 Mb	Chr 12: 51.42 – 51.5 Mb
PubMed search
- Wikidata
View/Edit Human	View/Edit Mouse

Sec1 family domain-containing protein 1 is a protein that in humans is encoded by the SCFD1 gene.

== Interactions ==
SCFD1 has been shown to interact with USO1.
