= GOSR1 =

Protein-coding gene in the species Homo sapiens

Identifiers
- Aliases: GOSR1, GOLIM2, GOS-28, GOS28, GOS28/P28, GS28, P28, golgi SNAP receptor complex member 1
- External IDs: OMIM: 604026; MGI: 1858260; GeneCards: GOSR1

Gene location (Human)
Chr.	Chromosome 17 (human)
Band	17q11.2	Start	30,477,362 bp
Band	17q11.2	End	30,527,592 bp

Gene location (Mouse)
Chr.	Chromosome 11 (mouse)
Band	11|11 B5	Start	76,617,428 bp
Band	11|11 B5	End	76,654,405 bp
RNA expression pattern
Bgee	Human / Mouse (ortholog); Top expressed in: buccal mucosa cell; nipple; tibia; visceral pleura; caput epididymis; Achilles tendon; pancreatic ductal cell; parietal pleura; corpus epididymis; tail of epididymis / Top expressed in: lumbar subsegment of spinal cord; stroma of bone marrow; left lung lobe; granulocyte; jejunum; epithelium of stomach; parotid gland; aortic valve; seminal vesicula; subcutaneous adipose tissue; More reference expression data
BioGPS	n/a
Gene ontology
Molecular function	SNAP receptor activity; SNARE binding
Cellular component	integral component of membrane; Golgi membrane; cis-Golgi network; Golgi apparatus; SNARE complex; membrane; Golgi medial cisterna; cytosol; transport vesicle
Biological process	protein transport; endoplasmic reticulum to Golgi vesicle-mediated transport; vesicle fusion; intra-Golgi vesicle-mediated transport; retrograde transport, endosome to Golgi; regulation of vesicle targeting, to, from or within Golgi; vesicle-mediated transport; transport
Sources:Amigo / QuickGO
Orthologs
Databases	NCBI: entry; OMA: entry
Species	Human	Mouse
Entrez	9527	53334
Ensembl	ENSG00000108587	ENSMUSG00000010392
UniProt	O95249	O88630
RefSeq (mRNA)	NM_001007024; NM_001007025; NM_004871	NM_016810; NM_001356321
RefSeq (protein)	NP_001007025; NP_001007026; NP_004862	NP_058090; NP_001343250
Location (UCSC)	Chr 17: 30.48 – 30.53 Mb	Chr 11: 76.62 – 76.65 Mb
PubMed search
- Wikidata
View/Edit Human	View/Edit Mouse

Golgi SNAP receptor complex member 1 is a protein that in humans is encoded by the GOSR1 gene.

This gene encodes a trafficking membrane protein which transports proteins among the endoplasmic reticulum and the Golgi apparatus and between Golgi compartments. This protein is considered an essential component of the Golgi SNAP receptor (SNARE) complex. Alternatively spliced transcript variants encoding distinct isoforms have been found for this gene.

== Interactions ==
GOSR1 has been shown to interact with USO1, BET1L and STX5.
