= 5'-Guanylyl imidodiphosphate =

Names
- IUPAC name Guanosine 5′-(tetrahydrogen 4-imidotriphosphate)
- Systematic IUPAC name O^{5}-{[(2R,3S,4R,5R)-5-(2-Amino-6-oxo-1,6-dihydro-9H-purin-9-yl)-3,4-dihydroxyoxolan-2-yl]methyl} tetrahydrogen 2-imidotriphosphate
- Other names GppNHp; GppNP; GMP-Pnp; GDP-NP; Guanylyl imidodiphosphate 5-Guanylylimidodiphosphate; 5′-Guanylyliminodiphosphonate

Identifiers
| CAS Number | 34273-04-6; 148892-91-5 (trisodium salt) |
| 3D model (JSmol) | Interactive image |
| ChEBI | CHEBI:78408 |
| ChemSpider | 33738 |
| PubChem CID | 36735 |
| UNII | 9L7GM5N7EG |
| CompTox Dashboard (EPA) | DTXSID20187842 |
- InChI: InChI=1S/C10H17N6O13P3/c11-10-13-7-4(8(19)14-10)12-2-16(7)9-6(18)5(17)3(28-9)1-27-32(25,26)29-31(23,24)15-30(20,21)22/h2-3,5-6,9,17-18H,1H2,(H,25,26)(H3,11,13,14,19)(H4,15,20,21,22,23,24)/t3-,5-,6-,9-/m1/s1 Key: UQABYHGXWYXDTK-UUOKFMHZSA-N
- SMILES: C1=NC2=C(N1[C@H]3[C@@H]([C@@H]([C@H](O3)COP(=O)(O)OP(=O)(NP(=O)(O)O)O)O)O)NC(=NC2=O)N

Properties
| Chemical formula | C_{10}H_{17}N_{6}O_{13}P_{3} |
| Molar mass | 522.196 g·mol^{−1} |
- Except where otherwise noted, data are given for materials in their standard state (at 25 °C [77 °F], 100 kPa). verify (what is ?) Infobox references

5'-Guanylyl imidodiphosphate (GDPNP) is a purine nucleotide. It is an analog of guanosine triphosphate in which one of the oxygen atoms is replaced with an amine, producing a non-hydrolyzable functional group. Guanylyl imidodiphosphate binds tightly to G-proteins in the presence of Mg^{2+}. Guanylyl imidodiphosphate is a potent stimulator of adenylate cyclase. It is often used in studies of protein synthesis.
