= Steven Clarke =

American biochemist (born 1949)

- Born: November 19, 1949 (age 76); Los Angeles, California
- Education: Pomona College, UCLA Brain Research Institute, Harvard University (Ph.D.)
- Known for: Molecular repair mechanisms, biochemistry of brains, Alzheimer's disease
- Scientific career
- Fields: Biochemistry
- Institutions: Glynn Research Laboratories (Bodmin, Cornwall), UCLA, University of California, Berkeley
- Doctoral advisor: Guido Guidotti
- Other academic advisors: Daniel Koshland

Steven G. Clarke, (born November 19, 1949) an American biochemist, is a director of the UCLA Molecular Biology Institute, a professor of chemistry and biochemistry at UCLA biochemistry department. Clarke heads a laboratory at UCLA's department of chemistry and biochemistry. Clarke is famous for his work on molecular damage and discoveries of novel molecular repair mechanisms.

Clarke has been on the faculty of the UCLA Department of Chemistry and Biochemistry since 1978. He is currently a professor of biochemistry and director of the UCLA Molecular Biology Institute.

== Early life and education ==
He was born in Los Angeles and attended public schools in Altadena and Pasadena, California.

He did his undergraduate work at Pomona College, a private institution, in Claremont, majoring in Chemistry and Zoology and graduating in 1970. During this time, he did undergraduate research at the UCLA Brain Research Institute with James E. Skinner and Professor Donald B. Lindsley on neural mechanisms of attention. He was also an NIH fellow in the laboratory of Peter Mitchell at Glynn Research Laboratories in Bodmin, England studying mitochondrial amino acid transport.

He obtained a PhD in biochemistry and molecular biology from Harvard University working as an NSF Fellow with Professor Guido Guidotti on membrane protein-detergent interactions and the identification of the major rat liver mitochondrial polypeptides as enzymes of the urea cycle. He returned to California to do postdoctoral work as a Miller Fellow at the University of California, Berkeley, with Professor Daniel Koshland, identifying membrane receptors for bacterial chemotaxis.

== Career ==
Clarke's research at UCLA has focused on roles of novel protein methyltransferases in aging and biological regulation highlighted by discoveries of the protein repair L-isoaspartyl methyltransferase, the isoprenylcysteine protein methyltransferase, and the protein phosphatase 2A methyltransferase.

He was a visiting scholar at Princeton University (1986–87) and at the University of Washington (2004-2005).

Clarke has conducted research on the biochemistry of brains and Alzheimer's disease since 1990.
