= GOSR2 =

Protein-coding gene in the species Homo sapiens

Available structures
PDB	Ortholog search: PDBe RCSB
PDB	List of PDB id codes 3EG9

Identifiers
- Aliases: GOSR2, Bos1, EPM6, GS27, golgi SNAP receptor complex member 2
- External IDs: OMIM: 604027; MGI: 1927204; HomoloGene: 37907; GeneCards: GOSR2; OMA:GOSR2 - orthologs

Gene location (Human)
Chr.	Chromosome 17 (human)
Band	17q21.32	Start	46,923,075 bp
Band	17q21.32	End	46,975,524 bp

Gene location (Mouse)
Chr.	Chromosome 11 (mouse)
Band	11 E1|11 67.43 cM	Start	103,676,849 bp
Band	11 E1|11 67.43 cM	End	103,697,898 bp
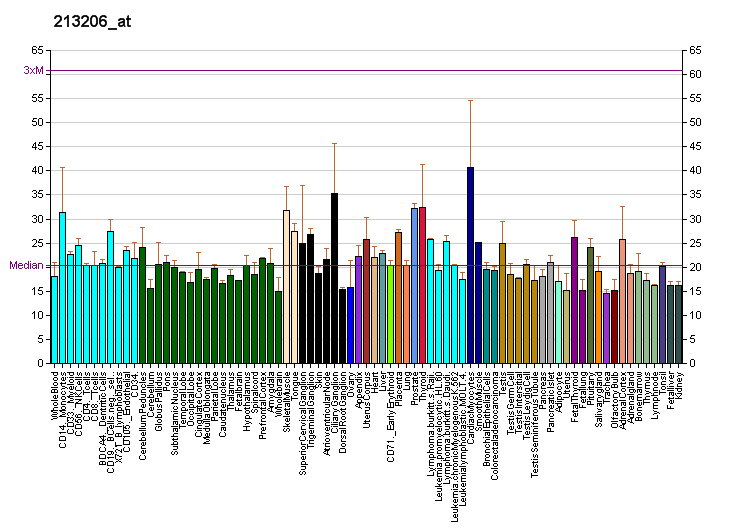

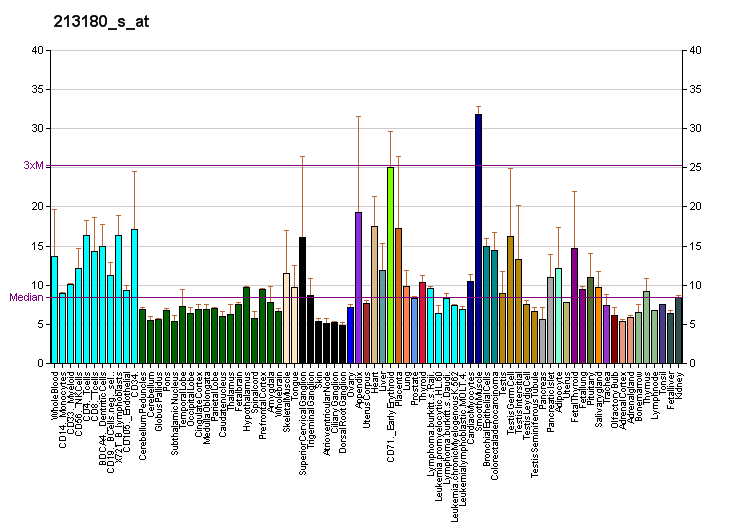

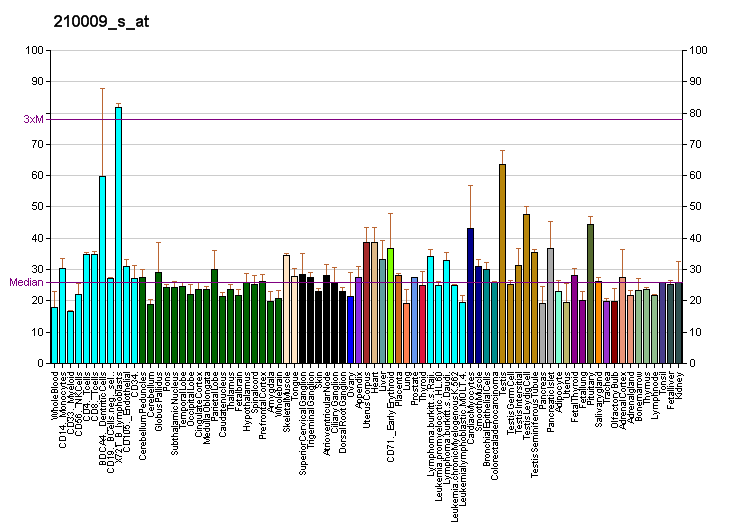
RNA expression pattern
Bgee	Human / Mouse (ortholog); Top expressed in: buccal mucosa cell; left testis; right testis; stromal cell of endometrium; epithelium of colon; anterior pituitary; islet of Langerhans; body of pancreas; C1 segment; gastrocnemius muscle / Top expressed in: molar; median eminence; arcuate nucleus; spermatocyte; stroma of bone marrow; calvaria; islet of Langerhans; lacrimal gland; endocardial cushion; decidua; More reference expression data
BioGPS	More reference expression data
Gene ontology
Molecular function	SNARE binding; SNAP receptor activity; protein binding
Cellular component	integral component of membrane; Golgi apparatus; membrane; endoplasmic reticulum-Golgi intermediate compartment membrane; ER to Golgi transport vesicle membrane; cytosol; late endosome membrane; Golgi membrane; SNARE complex; endoplasmic reticulum; endoplasmic reticulum membrane
Biological process	COPII vesicle coating; IRE1-mediated unfolded protein response; protein transport; vesicle-mediated transport; Golgi to vacuole transport; vesicle fusion with Golgi apparatus; retrograde transport, endosome to Golgi; protein targeting to vacuole; endoplasmic reticulum to Golgi vesicle-mediated transport; intra-Golgi vesicle-mediated transport; transport
Sources:Amigo / QuickGO
Orthologs
Species	Human	Mouse
Entrez	9570	56494
Ensembl	ENSG00000108433	ENSMUSG00000020946
UniProt	O14653	O35166
RefSeq (mRNA)	NM_001012511; NM_004287; NM_054022; NM_001321133; NM_001321134 NM_001330252; NM_001353114; NM_001353115; NM_001353116; NM_001363851	NM_019650
RefSeq (protein)	NP_001012529; NP_001308062; NP_001308063; NP_001317181; NP_004278 NP_473363; NP_001340043; NP_001340044; NP_001340045; NP_001350780	NP_062624; NP_001349781; NP_001349782; NP_001349783; NP_001349784 NP_001349785; NP_001349786; NP_001349787; NP_001349788; NP_001349789
Location (UCSC)	Chr 17: 46.92 – 46.98 Mb	Chr 11: 103.68 – 103.7 Mb
PubMed search
- Wikidata
View/Edit Human	View/Edit Mouse

Golgi SNAP receptor complex member 2 is a protein that in humans is encoded by the GOSR2 gene.

== Function ==
This gene encodes a trafficking membrane protein which transports proteins among the medial- and trans-Golgi compartments. Due to its chromosomal location and trafficking function, this gene may be involved in familial essential hypertension. Three transcript variants encoding three different isoforms have been found for this gene.

Mutations in the GOSR2 gene are linked with North Sea progressive myoclonus epilepsy (NS-PME), a rare subtype of progressive myoclonus epilepsy that is prevalent in northern Europe.

== Interactions ==
GOSR2 has been shown to interact with USO1 and STX5.
