= SEC22B =

Protein-coding gene in humans

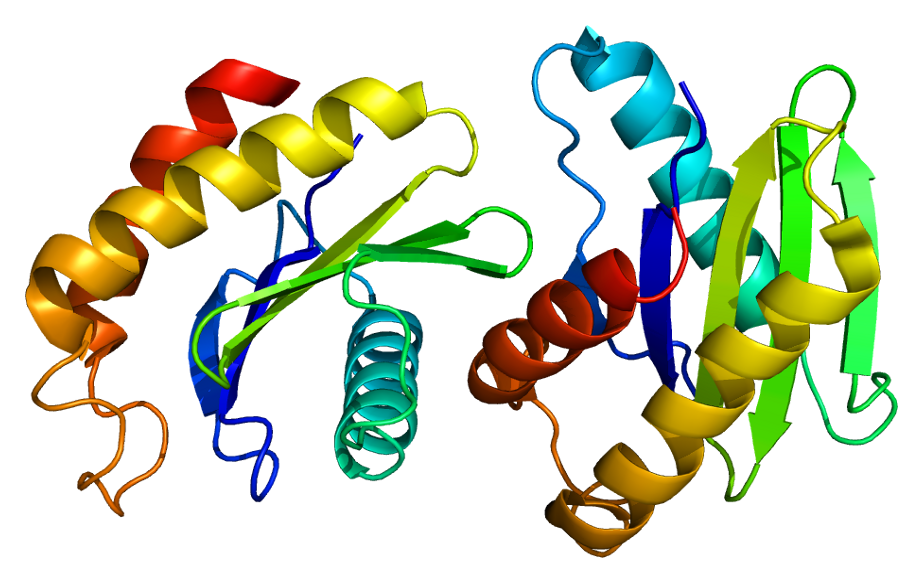

Identifiers
- Aliases: SEC22B, ERS-24, SEC22L1, SEC22 homolog B, vesicle trafficking protein (gene/pseudogene), SEC22 homolog B, vesicle trafficking protein
- External IDs: OMIM: 604029; MGI: 1338759; GeneCards: SEC22B
Available structures
PDB	Ortholog search: PDBe RCSB
PDB	List of PDB id codes 2NUP, 2NUT, 3EGD, 3EGX

Gene location (Human)
Chr.	Chromosome 1 (human)
Band	1p12	Start	120,150,898 bp
Band	1p12	End	120,176,520 bp

Gene location (Mouse)
Chr.	Chromosome 3 (mouse)
Band	3|3 F2.2	Start	97,808,506 bp
Band	3|3 F2.2	End	97,830,592 bp
RNA expression pattern
Bgee	Human / Mouse (ortholog); Top expressed in: Achilles tendon; body of pancreas; islet of Langerhans; stromal cell of endometrium; anterior pituitary; epithelium of colon; rectum; monocyte; left adrenal gland; Descending thoracic aorta / Top expressed in: cumulus cell; endocardial cushion; neural layer of retina; yolk sac; molar; lacrimal gland; islet of Langerhans; calvaria; primitive streak; seminal vesicula; More reference expression data
BioGPS	n/a
Gene ontology
Molecular function	SNAP receptor activity; protein binding; syntaxin binding; SNARE binding
Cellular component	integral component of membrane; Golgi apparatus; endoplasmic reticulum membrane; membrane; melanosome; endoplasmic reticulum; endoplasmic reticulum-Golgi intermediate compartment membrane; endoplasmic reticulum-Golgi intermediate compartment; SNARE complex; Golgi membrane; transport vesicle; phagocytic vesicle membrane; ER to Golgi transport vesicle membrane; synaptic vesicle
Biological process	positive regulation of protein catabolic process; vesicle fusion with Golgi apparatus; COPII vesicle coating; protein transport; vesicle-mediated transport; exocytosis; retrograde vesicle-mediated transport, Golgi to endoplasmic reticulum; antigen processing and presentation of exogenous peptide antigen via MHC class I, TAP-dependent; endoplasmic reticulum to Golgi vesicle-mediated transport; vesicle fusion with endoplasmic reticulum-Golgi intermediate compartment (ERGIC) membrane; negative regulation of autophagosome assembly
Sources:Amigo / QuickGO
Orthologs
Databases	NCBI: entry; OMA: entry
Species	Human	Mouse
Entrez	9554	20333
Ensembl	ENSG00000265808	ENSMUSG00000027879
UniProt	O75396	O08547
RefSeq (mRNA)	NM_004892	NM_011342
RefSeq (protein)	NP_004883	NP_035472
Location (UCSC)	Chr 1: 120.15 – 120.18 Mb	Chr 3: 97.81 – 97.83 Mb
PubMed search
- Wikidata
View/Edit Human	View/Edit Mouse

Vesicle-trafficking protein SEC22b is a protein that in humans is encoded by the SEC22B gene.

== Function ==
The protein encoded by this gene is a member of the SEC22 family of vesicle trafficking proteins. It associates with other SNARE proteins to form a SNARE complex and it is thought to play a role in the ER-Golgi protein trafficking. It is required for platelet alpha-granule biogenesis in megakaryocytes and is essential for the elongated morphology of endothelial cell Weibel–Palade bodies. This protein has strong similarity to Mus musculus and Cricetulus griseus proteins. There is evidence for use of multiple polyadenylation sites for the transcript. SEC22B has been shown to interact with syntaxin 18 and syntaxin 5.
