= YKT6 =

Protein-coding gene in humans

Identifiers
- Aliases: YKT6, YKT6 v-SNARE homolog
- External IDs: OMIM: 606209; MGI: 1927550; HomoloGene: 4778; GeneCards: YKT6; OMA:YKT6 - orthologs

Gene location (Human)
Chr.	Chromosome 7 (human)
Band	7p13	Start	44,200,959 bp
Band	7p13	End	44,214,294 bp

Gene location (Mouse)
Chr.	Chromosome 11 (mouse)
Band	11|11 A1	Start	5,905,693 bp
Band	11|11 A1	End	5,917,780 bp
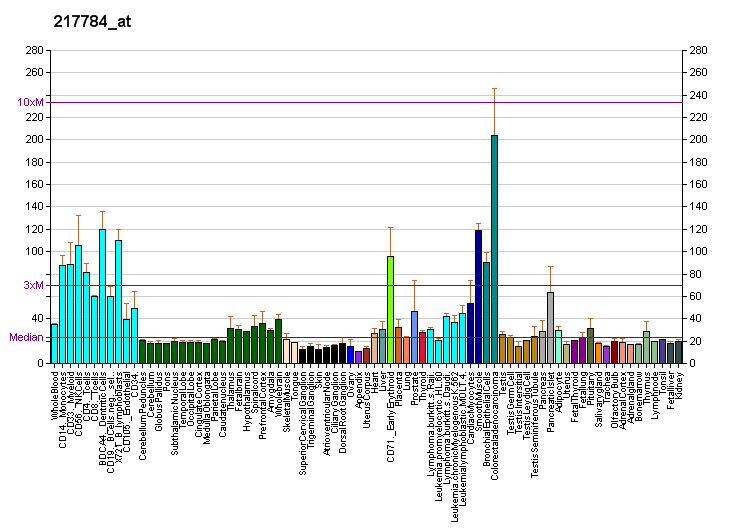

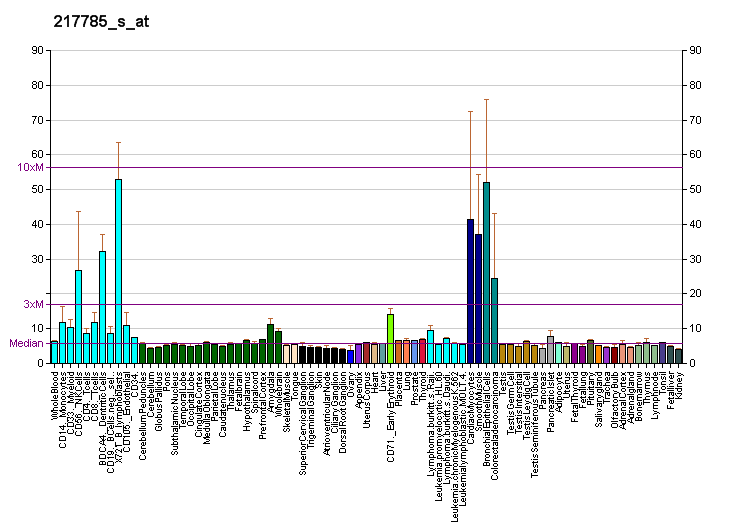
RNA expression pattern
Bgee	Human / Mouse (ortholog); Top expressed in: stromal cell of endometrium; islet of Langerhans; body of pancreas; mucosa of transverse colon; C1 segment; ganglionic eminence; granulocyte; body of stomach; smooth muscle tissue; right frontal lobe / Top expressed in: calvaria; stroma of bone marrow; molar; body of femur; pyloric antrum; epithelium of stomach; dermis; transitional epithelium of urinary bladder; skin of external ear; lip; More reference expression data
BioGPS	More reference expression data
Gene ontology
Molecular function	protein-cysteine S-palmitoyltransferase activity; transferase activity; SNAP receptor activity; SNARE binding; cadherin binding; protein binding
Cellular component	cytoplasm; integral component of membrane; endosome; Golgi apparatus; membrane; Golgi membrane; integral component of plasma membrane; basal dendrite; transport vesicle; soma; SNARE complex; endoplasmic reticulum; mitochondrion; cytoplasmic vesicle membrane; endoplasmic reticulum-Golgi intermediate compartment membrane; cytoplasmic vesicle; apical dendrite; cytosol
Biological process	vesicle targeting; vesicle docking involved in exocytosis; endoplasmic reticulum to Golgi vesicle-mediated transport; retrograde transport, endosome to Golgi; protein transport; vesicle fusion; vesicle-mediated transport; membrane fusion
Sources:Amigo / QuickGO
Orthologs
Species	Human	Mouse
Entrez	10652	56418
Ensembl	ENSG00000106636	ENSMUSG00000002741
UniProt	O15498	Q9CQW1
RefSeq (mRNA)	NM_006555; NM_001363678	NM_019661
RefSeq (protein)	NP_006546; NP_001350607; NP_006546.1	NP_062635
Location (UCSC)	Chr 7: 44.2 – 44.21 Mb	Chr 11: 5.91 – 5.92 Mb
PubMed search
- Wikidata
View/Edit Human	View/Edit Mouse

Synaptobrevin homolog YKT6 is a protein that in humans is encoded by the YKT6 gene.

== Function ==
This gene product is one of the SNARE recognition molecules implicated in vesicular transport between secretory compartments. It is a membrane associated, isoprenylated protein that functions at the endoplasmic reticulum-Golgi transport step. This protein is highly conserved from yeast to human and can functionally complement the loss of the yeast homolog in the yeast secretory pathway.

== Interactions ==
YKT6 has been shown to interact with BET1L.
