= NAPB =

Protein-coding gene in the species Homo sapiens

Identifiers
- Aliases: NAPB, SNAP-BETA, SNSF attachment protein beta
- External IDs: OMIM: 611270; MGI: 104562; HomoloGene: 5332; GeneCards: NAPB; OMA:NAPB - orthologs

Gene location (Human)
Chr.	Chromosome 20 (human)
Band	20p11.21	Start	23,374,519 bp
Band	20p11.21	End	23,421,519 bp

Gene location (Mouse)
Chr.	Chromosome 2 (mouse)
Band	2|2 G3	Start	148,535,905 bp
Band	2|2 G3	End	148,574,387 bp
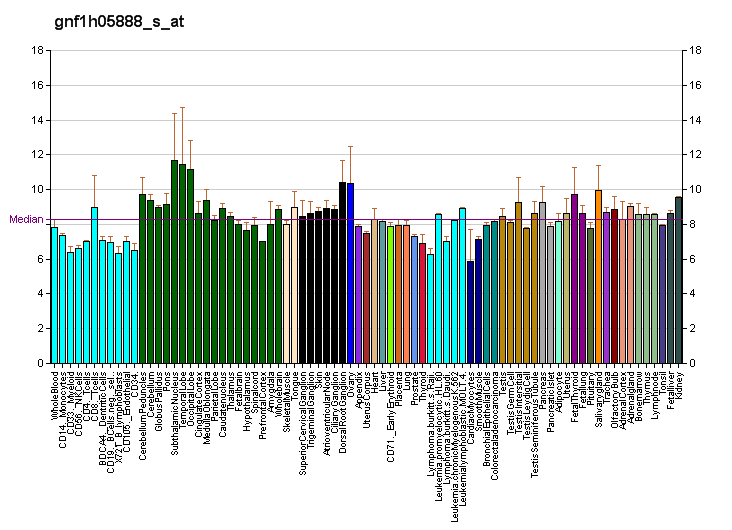
RNA expression pattern
Bgee	Human / Mouse (ortholog); Top expressed in: middle temporal gyrus; Brodmann area 23; endothelial cell; pons; superior frontal gyrus; cerebellar vermis; lateral nuclear group of thalamus; pars compacta; parietal lobe; postcentral gyrus / Top expressed in: pontine nuclei; subiculum; anterior amygdaloid area; habenula; medial vestibular nucleus; ventral tegmental area; prefrontal cortex; dorsal tegmental nucleus; ventromedial nucleus; dentate gyrus of hippocampal formation granule cell; More reference expression data
BioGPS	More reference expression data
Gene ontology
Molecular function	syntaxin binding; protein binding; soluble NSF attachment protein activity
Cellular component	SNARE complex; extracellular exosome; membrane; vacuolar membrane; synaptobrevin 2-SNAP-25-syntaxin-1a complex
Biological process	protein transport; SNARE complex disassembly; membrane fusion; intracellular protein transport; vesicle-mediated transport; transport; regulation of synaptic vesicle priming; synaptic transmission, glutamatergic
Sources:Amigo / QuickGO
Orthologs
Species	Human	Mouse
Entrez	63908	17957
Ensembl	ENSG00000125814	ENSMUSG00000027438
UniProt	Q9H115	P28663
RefSeq (mRNA)	NM_001283018; NM_001283020; NM_001283026; NM_022080	NM_019632
RefSeq (protein)	NP_001269947; NP_001269949; NP_001269955; NP_071363	NP_062606
Location (UCSC)	Chr 20: 23.37 – 23.42 Mb	Chr 2: 148.54 – 148.57 Mb
PubMed search
- Wikidata
View/Edit Human	View/Edit Mouse

Beta-soluble NSF attachment protein is a SNAP protein involved in vesicular trafficking and exocytosis which is encoded by the NAPB gene humans is.
