= Isolated hyperCKemia =

- Other names: Asymptomatic hyperCKemia
- Specialty: Medical genetics
- Symptoms: None other than high levels of creatine kinase in the blood
- Complications: None
- Usual onset: Birth
- Duration: Life-long
- Causes: Genetic mutation
- Diagnostic method: Genetic testing
- Prevention: none
- Medication: None required
- Prognosis: Good
- Frequency: Unknown, since almost all cases are asymptomatic

Isolated hyperCKemia is a benign genetic disorder which is characterized by high levels of creatine kinase (an enzyme) in the blood, usually, levels of CK in the blood of people with this disorder are 3 to 10 times higher than average. Unlike what most people experience when their CK blood levels are high, people with this disorder don't experience any symptoms, less commonly, people with isolated hyperCKemia have microscopic muscle cell abnormalities. This condition is a type of caveolinopathy since it is associated with the CAV3 gene, in chromosome 3. Although it is asymptomatic, people with this variant of hyperCKemia have an elevated risk of suffering from malignant hyperthermia.
