= USO1 =

Protein-coding gene in the species Homo sapiens

Identifiers
- Aliases: USO1, P115, TAP, VDP, USO1 vesicle transport factor
- External IDs: OMIM: 603344; MGI: 1929095; GeneCards: USO1
Available structures
PDB	Ortholog search: PDBe RCSB
PDB	List of PDB id codes 2W3C

Gene location (Human)
Chr.	Chromosome 4 (human)
Band	4q21.1	Start	75,724,577 bp
Band	4q21.1	End	75,814,286 bp

Gene location (Mouse)
Chr.	Chromosome 5 (mouse)
Band	5|5 E2	Start	92,285,797 bp
Band	5|5 E2	End	92,350,657 bp
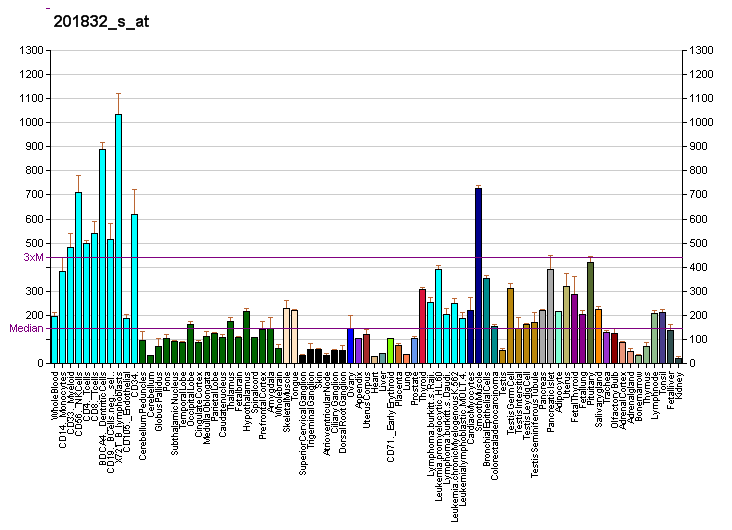

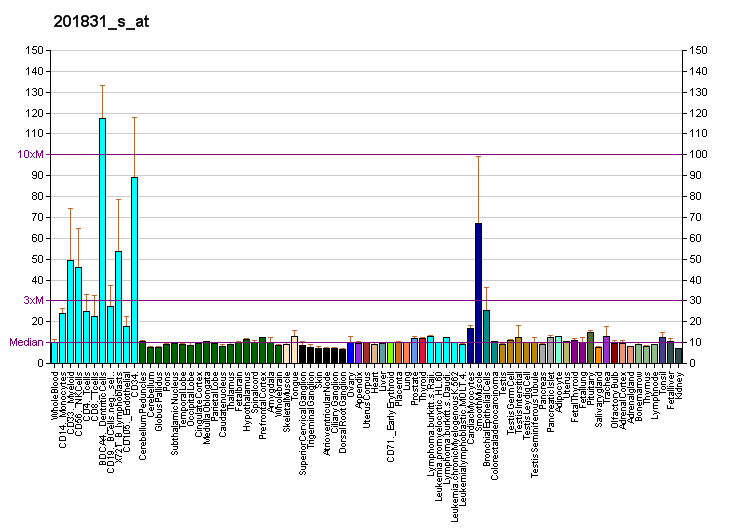
RNA expression pattern
Bgee	Human / Mouse (ortholog); Top expressed in: glutes; Skeletal muscle tissue of biceps brachii; deltoid muscle; parotid gland; triceps brachii muscle; tibia; thoracic diaphragm; Skeletal muscle tissue of rectus abdominis; tibialis anterior muscle; corpus epididymis / Top expressed in: lacrimal gland; seminal vesicula; calvaria; salivary gland; parotid gland; zygote; islet of Langerhans; temporal muscle; body of femur; submandibular gland; More reference expression data
BioGPS	More reference expression data
Gene ontology
Molecular function	protein binding; RNA binding; cadherin binding
Cellular component	cytoplasm; cytosol; Golgi apparatus; membrane; Golgi membrane; transport vesicle; endoplasmic reticulum; perinuclear region of cytoplasm; ER to Golgi transport vesicle membrane; Golgi stack; fibrillar center
Biological process	vesicle fusion with Golgi apparatus; membrane fusion; transcytosis; endoplasmic reticulum to Golgi vesicle-mediated transport; COPII vesicle coating; Golgi vesicle docking; protein transport; intracellular protein transport; vesicle-mediated transport; Golgi organization; transport; small GTPase mediated signal transduction; secretory granule localization; regulation of cellular response to insulin stimulus
Sources:Amigo / QuickGO
Orthologs
Databases	NCBI: entry; OMA: entry
Species	Human	Mouse
Entrez	8615	56041
Ensembl	ENSG00000138768	ENSMUSG00000029407
UniProt	O60763	Q9Z1Z0
RefSeq (mRNA)	NM_001290049; NM_003715	NM_019490
RefSeq (protein)	NP_001276978; NP_003706	NP_062363
Location (UCSC)	Chr 4: 75.72 – 75.81 Mb	Chr 5: 92.29 – 92.35 Mb
PubMed search
- Wikidata
View/Edit Human	View/Edit Mouse

General vesicular transport factor p115 is a protein that in humans is encoded by the USO1 gene.

== Function ==
The protein encoded by this gene is a peripheral membrane protein which recycles between the cytosol and the Golgi apparatus during interphase. It is regulated by phosphorylation: dephosphorylated protein associates with the Golgi membrane and dissociates from the membrane upon phosphorylation. Ras-associated protein 1 recruits this protein to coat protein complex II (COPII) vesicles during budding from the endoplasmic reticulum (ER), where it interacts with a set of COPII vesicle-associated SNAREs to form a cis-SNARE complex that promotes targeting to the Golgi apparatus. Transport from the ER to the cis/medial Golgi compartments requires the action of this gene product, GOLGA2, and giantin in a sequential manner.

== Interactions ==
USO1 has been shown to interact with:

- GOSR1,
- GOSR2,
- SCFD1, and
- STX5.
