= Guanosine triphosphate =

Chemical compound

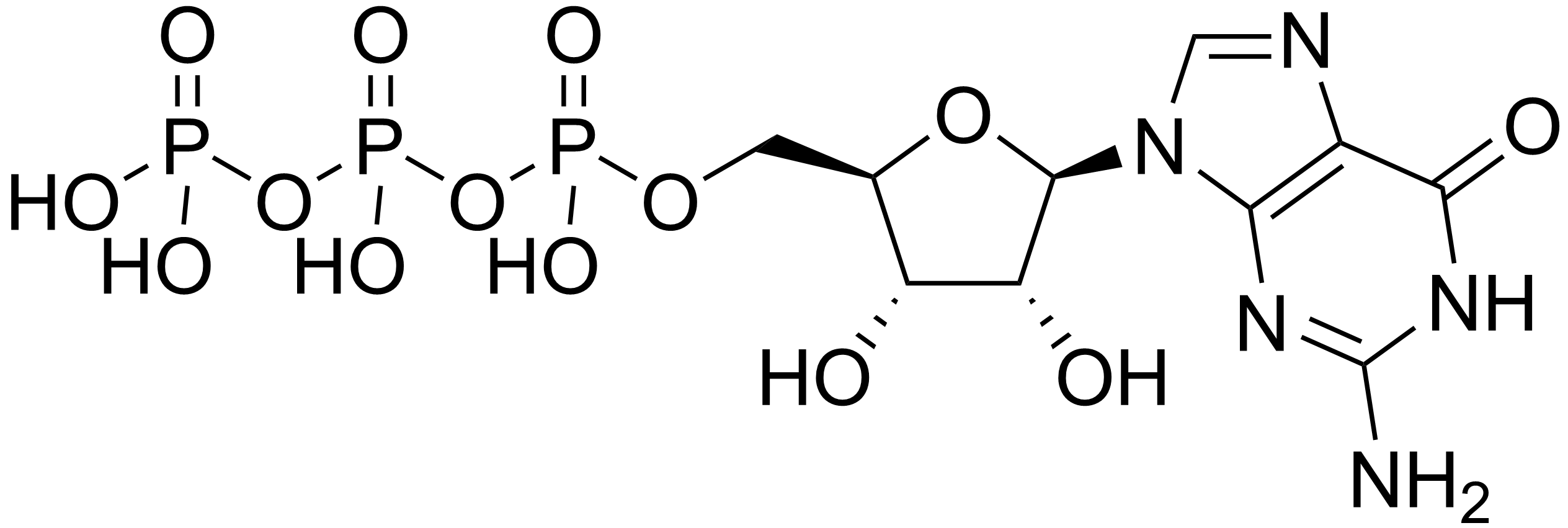

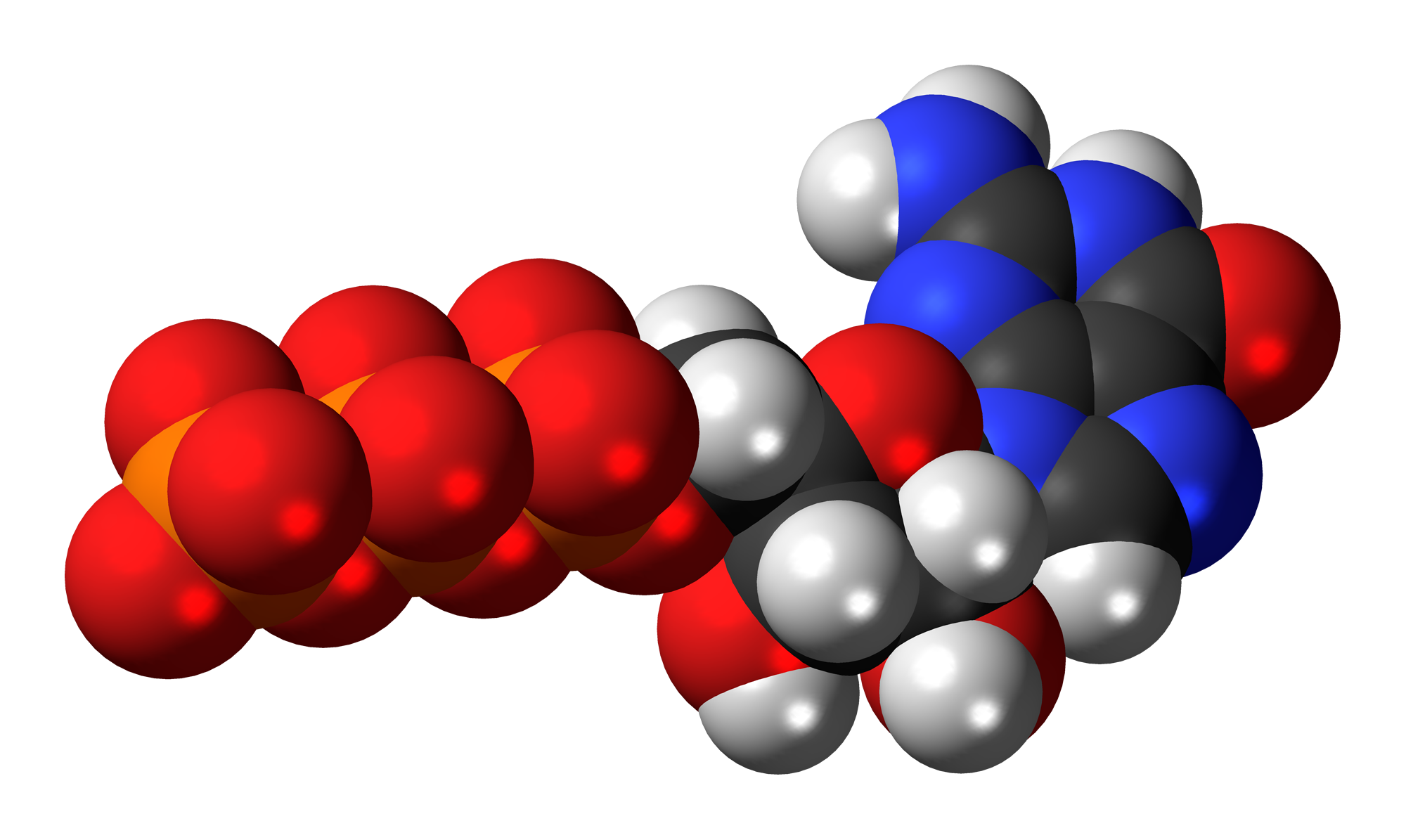

Names
- IUPAC name Guanosine 5′-(tetrahydrogen triphosphate)
- Systematic IUPAC name O^{1}-{[(2R,3S,4R,5R)-5-(2-Amino-6-oxo-1,6-dihydro-9H-purin-9-yl)-3,4-dihydroxyoxolan-2-yl]methyl} tetrahydrogen triphosphate
- Other names guanosine triphosphate, 9-β-D-ribofuranosylguanine-5'-triphosphate, 9-β-D-ribofuranosyl-2-amino-6-oxo-purine-5'-triphosphate

Identifiers
CAS Number	86-01-1
3D model (JSmol)	Interactive image
ChEBI	CHEBI:15996
ChemSpider	6569
ECHA InfoCard	100.001.498
IUPHAR/BPS	1742
KEGG	C00044
MeSH	Guanosine+triphosphate
PubChem CID	135398633
UNII	01WV7J708X
CompTox Dashboard (EPA)	DTXSID30235328
- InChI: InChI=1S/C10H16N5O14P3/c11-10-13-7-4(8(18)14-10)12-2-15(7)9-6(17)5(16)3(27-9)1-26-31(22,23)29-32(24,25)28-30(19,20)21/h2-3,5-6,9,16-17H,1H2,(H,22,23)(H,24,25)(H2,19,20,21)(H3,11,13,14,18)/t3-,5-,6-,9-/m1/s1 Key: XKMLYUALXHKNFT-UUOKFMHZSA-N; InChI=1/C10H16N5O14P3/c11-10-13-7-4(8(18)14-10)12-2-15(7)9-6(17)5(16)3(27-9)1-26-31(22,23)29-32(24,25)28-30(19,20)21/h2-3,5-6,9,16-17H,1H2,(H,22,23)(H,24,25)(H2,19,20,21)(H3,11,13,14,18)/t3-,5-,6-,9-/m1/s1 Key: XKMLYUALXHKNFT-UUOKFMHZBF
- SMILES: c1nc2c(n1[C@H]3[C@@H]([C@@H]([C@H](O3)CO[P@@](=O)(O)O[P@](=O)(O)OP(=O)(O)O)O)O)[nH]c(nc2=O)N

Properties
Chemical formula	C_{10}H_{16}N_{5}O_{14}P_{3}
Molar mass	523.180 g·mol^{−1}
- Except where otherwise noted, data are given for materials in their standard state (at 25 °C [77 °F], 100 kPa). verify (what is ?) Infobox references

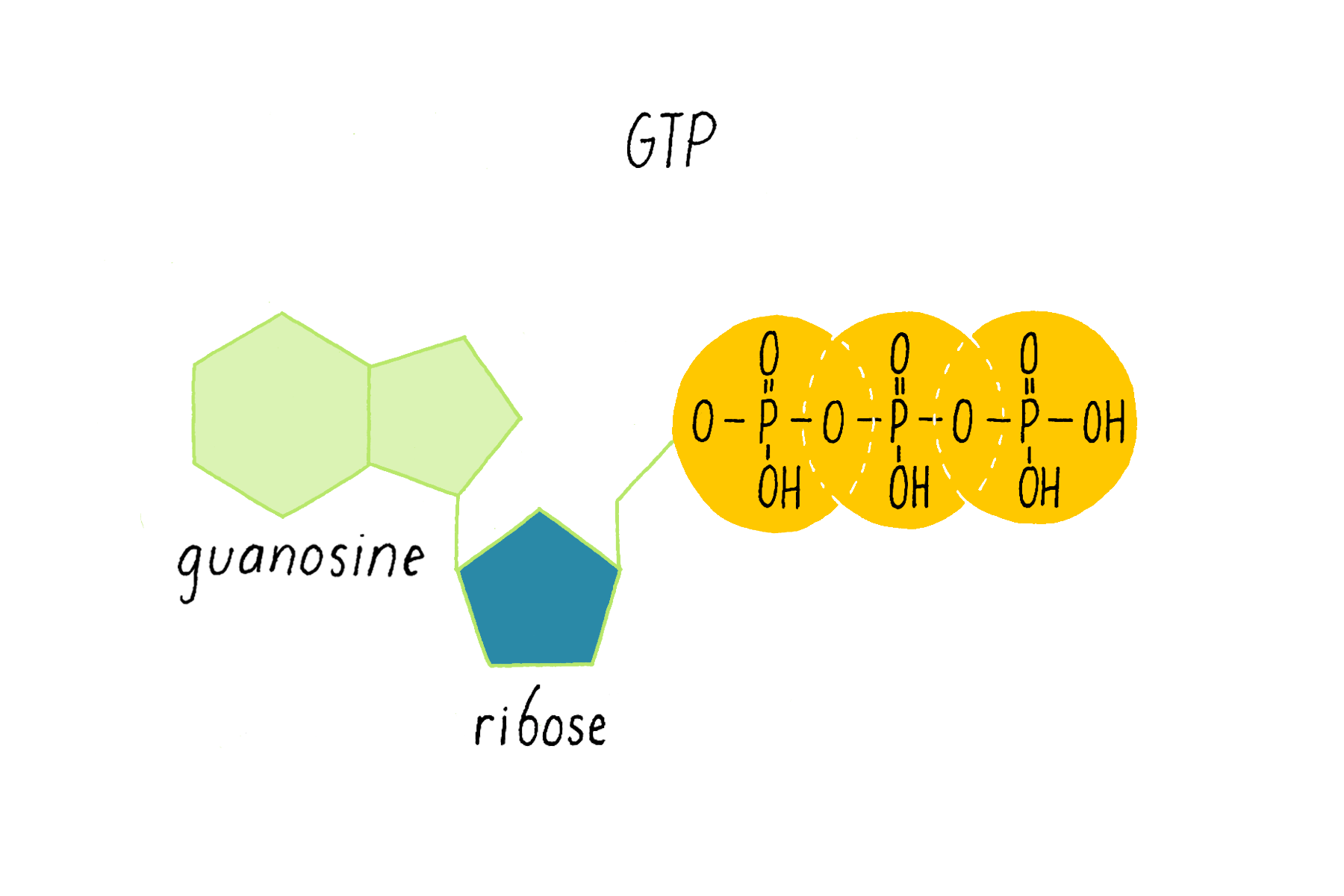
Guanosine triphosphate (GTP) is composed of guanine, a ribose sugar, and three phosphate groups. GTP is an energy source needed to make proteins and glucose.

Guanosine-5'-triphosphate (GTP) is a purine nucleoside triphosphate. It is one of the building blocks needed for the synthesis of RNA during the transcription process. Its structure is similar to that of the guanosine nucleoside, the only difference being that nucleotides like GTP have phosphates on their ribose sugar. GTP has the guanine nucleobase attached to the 1' carbon of the ribose and it has the triphosphate moiety attached to ribose's 5' carbon.

It also has roles as a source of energy and as an activator of substrates in metabolic reactions, similar to the roles of ATP, but it is more specific. It is used as a source of energy for protein synthesis and gluconeogenesis.

GTP is essential to signal transduction, in particular with G-proteins, in second-messenger mechanisms where it is converted to guanosine diphosphate (GDP) through the action of GTPases.

== Uses ==
=== Energy transfer ===
GTP is involved in energy transfer within the cell. For instance, a GTP molecule is generated by one of the enzymes in the citric acid cycle. This is tantamount to the generation of one molecule of ATP, since GTP is readily converted to ATP with nucleoside-diphosphate kinase (NDK).

=== Genetic translation ===
During the elongation stage of translation, GTP is used as an energy source for the binding of a new amino-bound tRNA to the A site of the ribosome. GTP is also used as an energy source for the translocation of the ribosome towards the 3' end of the mRNA.

=== Microtubule dynamic instability ===
During microtubule polymerization, each heterodimer formed by an alpha and a beta tubulin molecule carries two GTP molecules, and the GTP is hydrolyzed to GDP when the tubulin dimers are added to the plus end of the growing microtubule. Such GTP hydrolysis is not mandatory for microtubule formation, but it appears that only GDP-bound tubulin molecules are able to depolymerize. Thus, a GTP-bound tubulin serves as a cap at the tip of a microtubule to protect it from depolymerization; and, once the GTP is hydrolyzed, the microtubule begins to depolymerize and shrink rapidly.

=== Mitochondrial function ===
The translocation of proteins into the mitochondrial matrix involves the interactions of both GTP and ATP. The importing of these proteins plays an important role in several pathways regulated within mitochondria, such as converting oxaloacetate to phosphoenolpyruvate (PEP) in gluconeogenesis.

== Precursor for synthesis of riboflavin ==
GTP, in combination with ribulose 5-phosphate, are the precursor compounds for the synthesis of riboflavin (vitamin B_{2}).

== Biosynthesis ==
In the cell, GTP is synthesized through many processes including:

- as a byproduct of the succinyl-CoA to succinate conversion catalysed by the succinyl-CoA synthetase enzyme as part of the citric acid cycle;
- through exchanges of phosphate groups from ATP molecules by the nucleoside-diphosphate kinase, an enzyme tasked with maintaining an equilibrium between the concentrations of different nucleoside triphosphates.

== See also ==
- GTP-gamma-S
- GDPCP
- G protein
- G protein-coupled receptor
- 5'-Guanylyl imidodiphosphate
