= NSFL1C =

Protein-coding gene in the species Homo sapiens

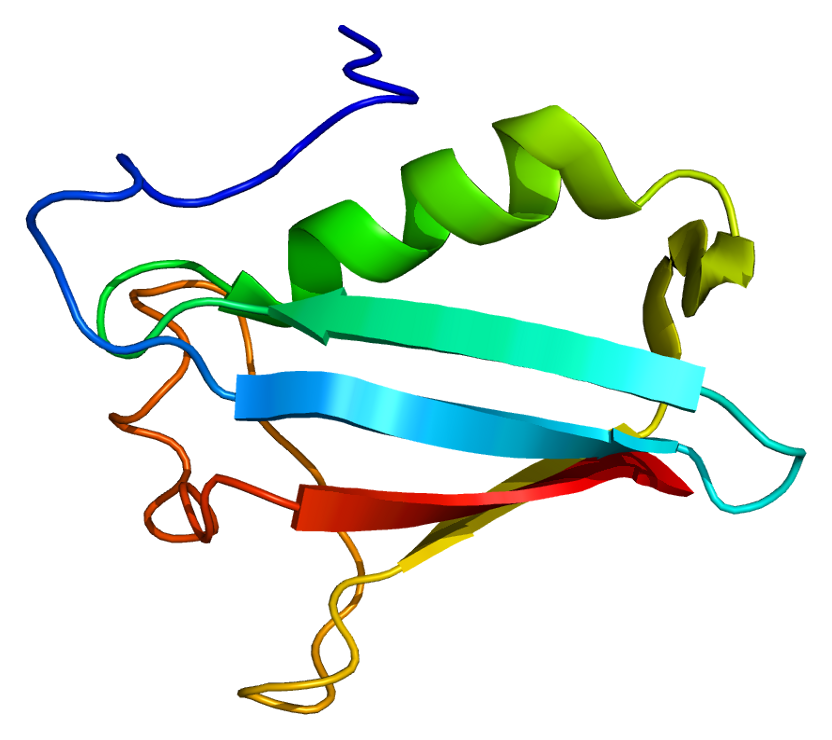

Identifiers
- Aliases: NSFL1C, P47, UBX1, UBXD10, UBXN2C, dJ776F14.1, NSFL1 cofactor
- External IDs: OMIM: 606610; MGI: 3042273; GeneCards: NSFL1C
Available structures
PDB	Ortholog search: PDBe RCSB
PDB	List of PDB id codes 1SS6

Gene location (Human)
Chr.	Chromosome 20 (human)
Band	20p13	Start	1,442,162 bp
Band	20p13	End	1,473,842 bp

Gene location (Mouse)
Chr.	Chromosome 2 (mouse)
Band	2|2 G3	Start	151,336,102 bp
Band	2|2 G3	End	151,353,334 bp
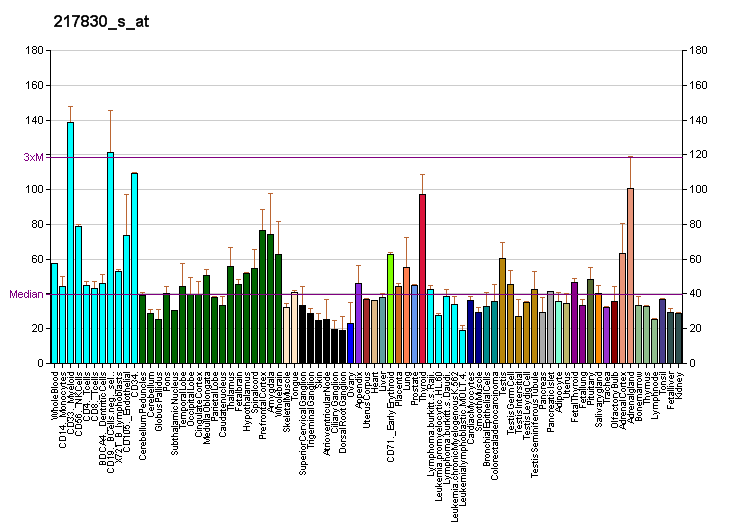

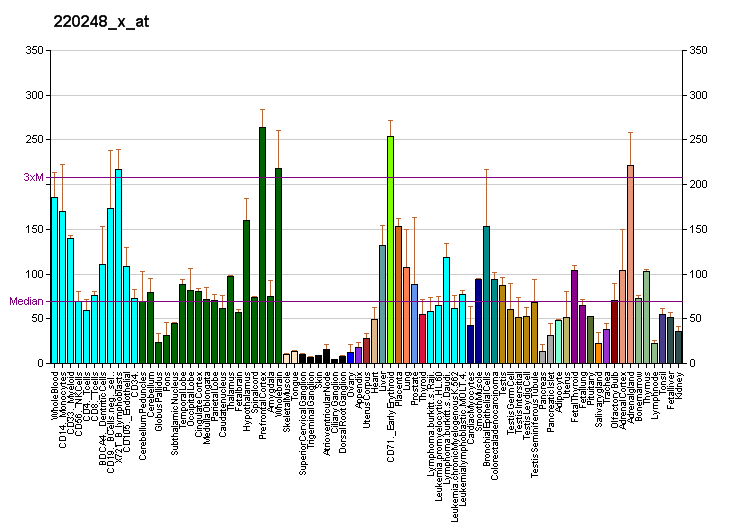

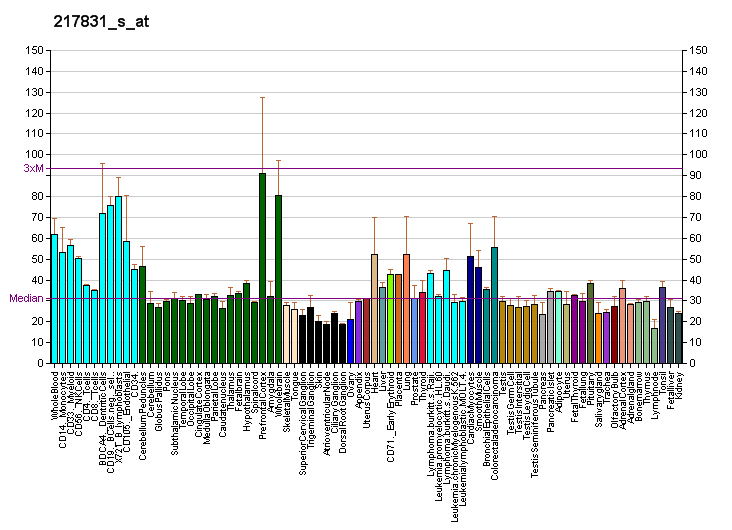
RNA expression pattern
Bgee	Human / Mouse (ortholog); Top expressed in: right adrenal gland; right adrenal cortex; left adrenal gland; gastrocnemius muscle; left adrenal cortex; skin of leg; tibialis anterior muscle; skin of abdomen; retinal pigment epithelium; monocyte / Top expressed in: tail of embryo; lens; neural layer of retina; genital tubercle; neural tube; hypothalamus; yolk sac; olfactory bulb; ventricular zone; ovary; More reference expression data
BioGPS	More reference expression data
Gene ontology
Molecular function	lipid binding; ubiquitin binding; protein binding; phospholipid binding; protein phosphatase regulator activity; ATPase binding
Cellular component	Golgi stack; plasma membrane; Golgi apparatus; intermediate filament cytoskeleton; VCP-NSFL1C complex; nucleus; nucleoplasm; chromosome; cytosol; spindle pole centrosome; cytoplasm; microtubule organizing center; cytoskeleton
Biological process	membrane fusion; nuclear membrane reassembly; Golgi organization; proteasome-mediated ubiquitin-dependent protein catabolic process; autophagosome assembly; regulation of phosphoprotein phosphatase activity; establishment of mitotic spindle orientation; positive regulation of mitotic centrosome separation; negative regulation of protein localization to centrosome
Sources:Amigo / QuickGO
Orthologs
Databases	NCBI: entry; OMA: entry
Species	Human	Mouse
Entrez	55968	386649
Ensembl	ENSG00000088833	ENSMUSG00000027455
UniProt	Q9UNZ2	Q9CZ44
RefSeq (mRNA)	NM_001206736; NM_016143; NM_018839; NM_182483	NM_001291074; NM_198326
RefSeq (protein)	NP_001193665; NP_057227; NP_061327	NP_001278003; NP_938085
Location (UCSC)	Chr 20: 1.44 – 1.47 Mb	Chr 2: 151.34 – 151.35 Mb
PubMed search
- Wikidata
View/Edit Human	View/Edit Mouse

NSFL1 cofactor p47 is a protein that in humans is encoded by the NSFL1C gene.

N-ethylmaleimide-sensitive factor (NSF) and valosin-containing protein (p97) are two ATPases known to be involved in transport vesicle/target membrane fusion and fusions between membrane compartments. A trimer of the protein encoded by this gene binds a hexamer of cytosolic p97 and is required for p97-mediated regrowth of Golgi cisternae from mitotic Golgi fragments. Multiple transcript variants encoding several different isoforms have been found for this gene.

== Interactions ==
NSFL1C has been shown to interact with Valosin-containing protein.
