= L-Arginine ethyl ester =

l-Arginine ethyl ester
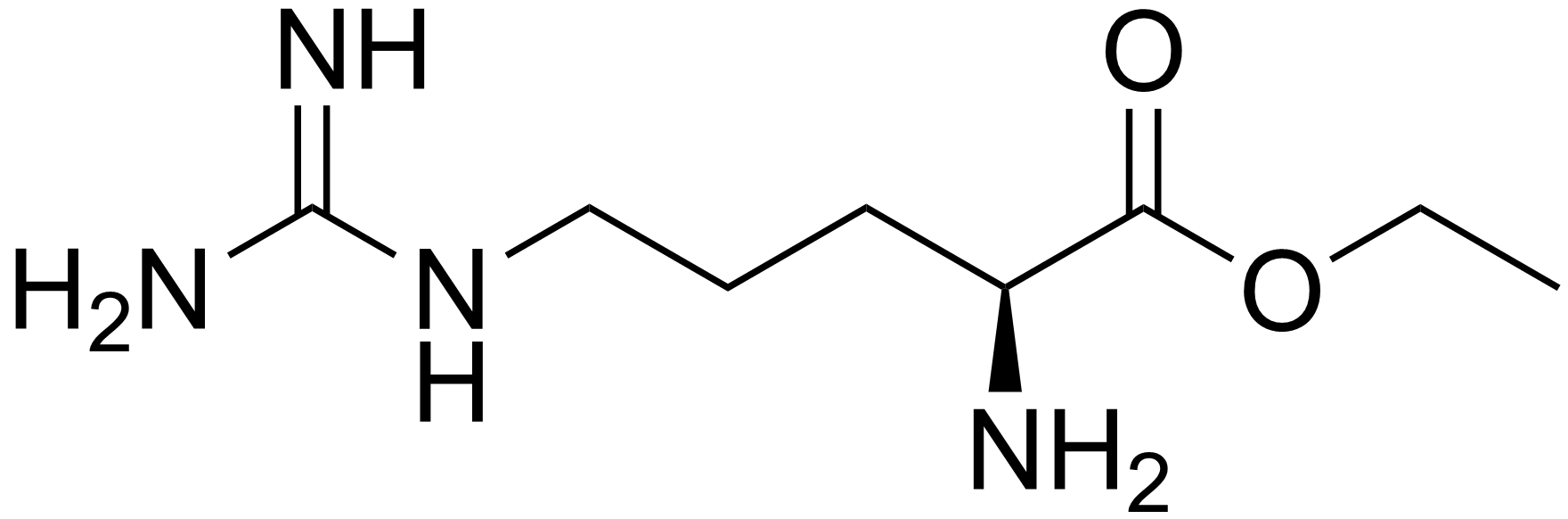

Names
- IUPAC name (S)-Ethyl 2-amino-5-(diaminomethylideneamino)pentanoate
- Other names Arginine ethyl ester; Ethyl l-arginate

Identifiers
CAS Number	28696-31-3
3D model (JSmol)	Interactive image
ChemSpider	3839984
PubChem CID	4650467
UNII	B55W8VNE0L
CompTox Dashboard (EPA)	DTXSID60182856
- InChI: InChI=1S/C8H18N4O2/c1-2-14-7(13)6(9)4-3-5-12-8(10)11/h6H,2-5,9H2,1H3,(H4,10,11,12) Key: AKGWUHIOEVNNPC-UHFFFAOYSA-N
- SMILES: O=C(OCC)[C@@H](N)CCCNC(N)=N

Properties
Chemical formula	C_{8}H_{18}N_{4}O_{2}
Molar mass	202.258 g·mol^{−1}
Solubility in water	soluble
- Except where otherwise noted, data are given for materials in their standard state (at 25 °C [77 °F], 100 kPa). Infobox references

l-Arginine ethyl ester or ethyl arginate is an alternative supplement form of the conditionally-essential amino acid arginine bound to an ethyl ester. Esters are organic compounds formed by esterification – the reaction of carboxylic acid and alcohols.

== Physical and chemical properties ==
l-Arginine ethyl ester is a white powder quickly soluble in hot water. It has a characteristically bad and bitter taste, thus before drinking it is recommended to mix the powder with a strongly flavored beverage or citrus juice.

Arginine ethyl ester falls under the category of protected aminoacids. These are modified aminoacids molecules which show a different pharmacokinetics and pharmacodynamics compared to the base form. In fact the ethyl ester in Arginine ethyl ester is bound to the hydrogen side of the molecule, protecting it from hydrolization by the enzyme arginase, which in fact attaches to arginine on this side, until the ester is cleaved by esterases enzymes. The ester also confers lipophylicity to this form of arginine, base arginine is hydrophilic, allowing it to passively penetrate cells membranes, i.e. it doesn't need the specific transporter to cross lipid membranes, in so allowing maximum tissue distribution. Many pharmaceutical compounds are attached to an ethyl ester for the very same purpose of enhancing tissues distribution. Arginine ethyl ester acts as a prodrug, the clivage of the ester by esterases yield arginine and ethanol.

== Uses ==
l-Arginine ethyl ester is biochemical reagent which can be used as a pharmaceutical intermediate.
