= L-isoaspartyl methyltransferase =

Protein-L-isoaspartate (D-aspartate) O-methyltransferase (PIMT, PCMT)
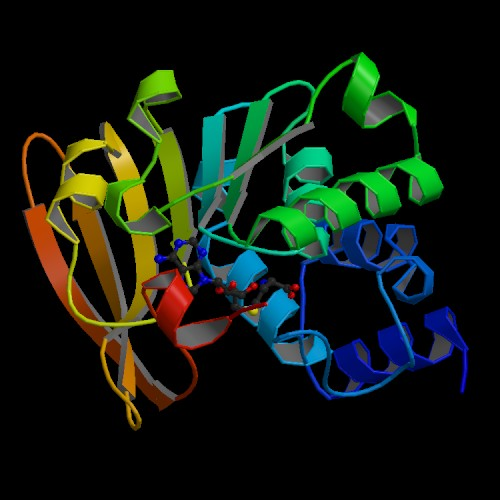
- Crystallographic structure of Human L-isoaspartyl methyltransferase.

Identifiers
- EC no.: 2.1.1.77
- CAS no.: 105638-50-4

Databases
- IntEnz: IntEnz view
- BRENDA: BRENDA entry
- ExPASy: NiceZyme view
- KEGG: KEGG entry
- MetaCyc: metabolic pathway
- PRIAM: profile
- PDB structures: RCSB PDB PDBe PDBsum
- Gene Ontology: AmiGO / QuickGO
Search
- PMC: articles
- PubMed: articles
- NCBI: proteins

Protein-L-isoaspartate(D-aspartate) O-methyltransferase

Identifiers
- Symbol: PCMT
- Pfam: PF01135
- InterPro: IPR000682
- PROSITE: PDOC00985
- SCOP2: 1dl5 / SCOPe / SUPFAM
Available protein structures:
- Pfam: structures / ECOD
- PDB: RCSB PDB; PDBe; PDBj
- PDBsum: structure summary
- PDB: 1jg2A:13-216 1jg3B:13-216 1jg4A:13-216 1jg1A:13-216 1r18A:8-221 1kr5A:8-221 1i1nA:8-221 1vbfA:2-201 1dl5B:1-213

Protein L-isoaspartyl methyltransferase (PIMT, PCMT), also called S-adenosyl-L-methionine:protein-L-isoaspartate O-methyltransferase, is an enzyme which recognizes and catalyzes the repair of damaged L-isoaspartyl and D-aspartyl groups in proteins. It is a highly conserved enzyme which is present in nearly all eukaryotes, archaebacteria, and Gram-negative eubacteria.

== Function ==
PIMT acts to transfer methyl groups from S-adenosyl-L-methionine to the alpha side chain carboxyl groups of damaged L-isoaspartyl and D-aspartyl amino acids. The enzyme takes the end methyl residue from the methionine side chain and adds it to the side chain carboxyl group of L-isoaspartate or D-aspartate to create a methyl ester. Subsequent nonenzymatic reactions result in a rapid transformation to L-succinimide, which is a precursor to aspartate and isoaspartate. The L-succinimide can then undergo nonenzymatic hydrolysis, which generates some repaired L-aspartyl residues as well as some L-isoaspartyl residues, which can then enter the cycle again for eventual conversion to the normal peptide linkage.

PIMT tends to act on proteins that have been non-enzymatically damaged due to age. By performing this repair mechanism, the enzyme helps to maintain overall protein integrity. This mechanism has been observed by several groups, and has been confirmed through experimental testing. In one report, PIMT was inhibited by adenosine dialdehyde. The results supported the proposed function of the enzyme, as the amount of abnormal L-aspartate residues increased when cells were treated with the indirect inhibitor, adenosine dialdehyde. Additionally, S-adenosylhomocysteine is known to be a competitive inhibitor of PIMT. When PIMT is not present in cells, the abnormal aspartyl residues accumulate, creating abnormal proteins that have been known to cause fatal progressive epilepsy in mice. It has been suggested that calmodulin may play a role in stimulating the function of PIMT, although the relationship between these two molecules has not been thoroughly explored. In addition to calmodulin, guanosine 5'-O-[gamma-thio]triphosphate (GTPgammaS) has been found to stimulate PIMT activity.

== Structure ==
The enzyme is present in human cytosol in two forms due to alternative splicing and differs among individuals in the population due to a single polymorphism at residue 119, either valine or isoleucine. The enzyme structure is described as a “doubly wound alpha/beta/alpha sandwich structure” which is quite consistent in all species analyzed thus far. If there is any difference in the sequences between different organisms it occurs in the regions connecting the three motifs in the sandwich structure, but the sequence of the individual motifs tends to be highly conserved. Researchers have found the active site to be in the loop between the beta structure and the second alpha helix and have determined it to be highly specific for isoaspartyl residues. For example, the residues found at the C-terminus of drosophila PIMT (dPIMT) are rotated 90 degrees so as to allow more space for a substrate to interact with the enzyme. In fact, dPIMT appears to alternate between this unique open conformation and the less open conformation common of PIMT in other organisms. Although possibly unrelated to this, increased levels of dPIMT in drosophila have been correlated with increase life expectancy in these organisms due to their importance in protein repair.

== Reaction ==
Reaction catalysed by PIMT

== See also ==
- methyltransferase
- isoaspartate
- aspartic acid
