= Isoaspartate =

Isoaspartyl formation reaction of Asn-Gly (top right) to Asp-Gly (at left) or iso(Asp)-Gly (in green at bottom right).

Isoaspartic acid (isoaspartate, isoaspartyl, β-aspartate) is an aspartic acid residue isomeric to the typical α peptide linkage. It is a β-amino acid, with the side chain carboxyl moved to the backbone. Such a change is caused by a chemical reaction in which the nitrogen atom on the N+1 following peptide bond (in black at top right of Figure 1) nucleophilically attacks the γ-carbon of the side chain of an asparagine or aspartic acid residue, forming a succinimide intermediate (in red). Hydrolysis of the intermediate results in two products, either aspartic acid (in black at left) or isoaspartic acid, which is a β-amino acid (in green at bottom right). The reaction also results in the deamidation of the asparagine residue. Racemization may occur leading to the formation of D-aminoacids.

== Kinetics of isoaspartyl formation ==
Isoaspartyl formation reactions have been conjectured to be one of the factors that limit the useful lifetime of proteins.

Isoaspartyl formation proceeds much more quickly if the asparagine is followed by a small, flexible residue (such as Gly) that leaves the peptide group open for attack. These reactions also proceed much more quickly at elevated pH (>10) and temperatures.

== Repair ==
L-isoaspartyl methyltransferase repairs isoaspartate and D-aspartate residues by sticking a methyl group onto the side chain carboxyl group in the residue, creating an ester. The ester rapidly and spontaneously turns into the succinimide (red), and randomly turns back into normal aspartic acid (black) or isoaspartate again (green) for another attempt.
