= N-ethylmaleimide sensitive fusion protein =

Protein-coding gene in Homo sapiens

NSF
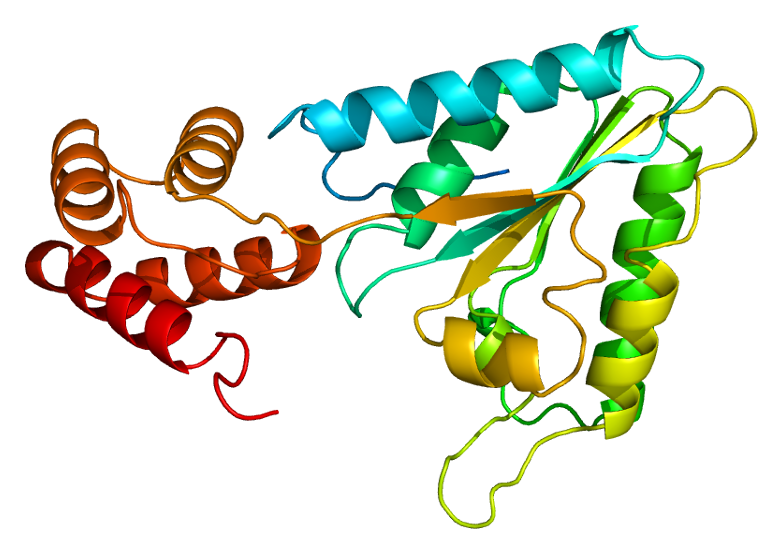

Identifiers
- Aliases: NSF, SKD2, N-ethylmaleimide sensitive factor, N-ethylmaleimide sensitive factor, vesicle fusing ATPase, SEC18, DEE96
- External IDs: OMIM: 601633; MGI: 104560; HomoloGene: 4502; GeneCards: NSF; OMA:NSF - orthologs

Gene location (Human)
Chr.	Chromosome 17 (human)
Band	17q21.31	Start	46,590,669 bp
Band	17q21.31	End	46,757,464 bp

Gene location (Mouse)
Chr.	Chromosome 11 (mouse)
Band	11 E1|11 67.54 cM	Start	103,712,608 bp
Band	11 E1|11 67.54 cM	End	103,844,882 bp
RNA expression pattern
Bgee	Human / Mouse (ortholog); Top expressed in: superior frontal gyrus; prefrontal cortex; primary visual cortex; Brodmann area 9; right frontal lobe; cerebellar cortex; anterior cingulate cortex; cerebellar hemisphere; nucleus accumbens; hypothalamus / Top expressed in: dentate gyrus of hippocampal formation granule cell; pontine nuclei; subiculum; medial dorsal nucleus; medial vestibular nucleus; dorsal tegmental nucleus; superior colliculus; medial geniculate nucleus; deep cerebellar nuclei; ventral tegmental area; More reference expression data
BioGPS	n/a
Gene ontology
Molecular function	nucleotide binding; PDZ domain binding; syntaxin-1 binding; metal ion binding; protein binding; syntaxin binding; hydrolase activity; ATP binding; protein kinase binding; SNARE binding; protein-containing complex binding; ionotropic glutamate receptor binding; ATPase activity
Cellular component	postsynaptic density; myelin sheath; plasma membrane; dendritic shaft; lysosomal membrane; extracellular exosome; Golgi membrane; cytoplasm; cytosol; Golgi stack
Biological process	plasma membrane fusion; positive regulation of protein catabolic process; regulation of exocytosis; potassium ion transport; endoplasmic reticulum to Golgi vesicle-mediated transport; COPII vesicle coating; protein transport; intracellular protein transport; vesicle-mediated transport; positive regulation of receptor recycling; exocytosis; retrograde vesicle-mediated transport, Golgi to endoplasmic reticulum; SNARE complex disassembly; transport; Golgi to plasma membrane protein transport; Golgi vesicle docking
Sources:Amigo / QuickGO
Orthologs
Species	Human	Mouse
Entrez	4905	18195
Ensembl	ENSG00000073969; ENSG00000278174; ENSG00000276262	ENSMUSG00000034187
UniProt	P46459	P46460
RefSeq (mRNA)	NM_006178	NM_008740
RefSeq (protein)	NP_006169	NP_032766
Location (UCSC)	Chr 17: 46.59 – 46.76 Mb	Chr 11: 103.71 – 103.84 Mb
PubMed search
- Wikidata
View/Edit Human	View/Edit Mouse

N-ethylmaleimide-sensitive factor, also known as NSF or N-ethylmaleimide sensitive fusion proteins, is an enzyme which in humans is encoded by the NSF gene.

== Function ==
NSF is a homohexameric AAA ATPase involved in membrane fusion. NSF is ubiquitously found in the membrane of eukaryotic cells. It is a central component of the cellular machinery in the transfer of membrane vesicles from one membrane compartment to another. During this process, SNARE proteins on two joining membranes (usually a vesicle and a target membrane such as the plasma membrane) form a complex, with the α-helical domains of the SNAREs coiling around each other and forming a very stable four-helix bundle. As SNAREs intertwine, they pull the vesicle towards the target membrane, excluding water and promoting fusion of the vesicle with the target membrane. NSF unravels SNARE complexes once membrane fusion has occurred, using the hydrolysis of ATP as an energy source, allowing the dissociated SNAREs to be recycled for reuse in further rounds of membrane fusion. This proposal remains controversial, however. Recent work indicates that the ATPase function of NSF does not function in recycling of vesicles but rather functions in the act of fusing vesicles with the plasma membrane.

== SNARE hypothesis ==
Because neuronal function depends on the release of neurotransmitters at a synapse — a process in which synaptic vesicles fuse with the presynaptic membrane — NSF is a key synaptic component. Thus, conditional temperature-sensitive mutations in the Drosophila melanogaster gene for NSF lead to a comatose behaviour at the restrictive temperature (and hence the gene is called comatose), presumably because neuronal functions are blocked. In Dictyostelium discoideum amoebae, similar mutations lead to a cessation of cell movement at the restrictive temperature, indicating a role for intracellular membrane transport in migration. Another neuronal role for NSF is indicated by its direct binding to the GluR2 subunit of AMPA type glutamate receptors (which detect the neurotransmitter glutamate). This gives NSF a putative role in delivery and expression of AMPA receptors at the synapse.

NSF was discovered by James Rothman and colleagues in 1987 while at Stanford University; they identified NSF after observing that a cytoplasmic factor, required for membrane fusions, was inactivated by treatment with N-ethylmaleimide. This assay enabled them to purify NSF.

== Interactions ==
N-ethylmaleimide sensitive fusion protein has been shown to interact with NAPA.
