= GTPgammaS =

Names
- IUPAC name [(2S,3R,4S,5S)-5-(2-amino-6-oxo-3H-purin-9-yl)-3,4-dihydroxyoxolan-2-yl]methyl dihydroxyphosphinothioyl hydrogen phosphate

Identifiers
CAS Number	37589-80-3
3D model (JSmol)	Interactive image
ChEBI	CHEBI:43000
ChEMBL	ChEMBL1204628
ChemSpider	34654
DrugBank	DB01864
IUPHAR/BPS	4207
KEGG	C01806
PubChem CID	135398675
UNII	EJ7Q9D2M9D
CompTox Dashboard (EPA)	DTXSID701337847
- InChI: InChI=34654 Key: XOFLBQFBSOEHOG-UUOKFMHZBU; InChI=1/C10H16N5O13P3S/c11-10-13-7-4(8(18)14-10)12-2-15(7)9-6(17)5(16)3(26-9)1-25-29(19,20)27-30(21,22)28-31(23,24)32/h2-3,5-6,9,16-17H,1H2,(H,19,20)(H,21,22)(H2,23,24,32)(H3,11,13,14,18)/t3-,5-,6-,9-/m1/s1
- SMILES: S=P(O)(O)OP(=O)(O)OP(=O)(O)OC[C@H]3O[C@@H](n1cnc2c1NC(=N/C2=O)\N)[C@H](O)[C@@H]3O

Properties
Chemical formula	C_{10}H_{16}N_{5}O_{13}P_{3}S
Molar mass	539.24 g·mol^{−1}
- Except where otherwise noted, data are given for materials in their standard state (at 25 °C [77 °F], 100 kPa). verify (what is ?) Infobox references

GTPgammaS (GTPγS, guanosine 5'-O-[gamma-thio]triphosphate) is a non-hydrolyzable or slowly hydrolyzable G-protein-activating analog of guanosine triphosphate (GTP). Many GTP binding proteins demonstrate activity when bound to GTP, and are inactivated via the hydrolysis of the phosphoanhydride bond that links the γ-phosphate to the remainder of the nucleotide, leaving a bound guanosine diphosphate (GDP) and releasing an inorganic phosphate. This usually occurs rapidly, and the GTP-binding protein can then only be activated by exchanging the GDP for a new GTP molecule. The substitution of sulfur for one of the oxygens of the γ-phosphate of GTP creates a nucleotide that either cannot be hydrolyzed or is only slowly hydrolyzed. This prevents the GTP-binding proteins from being inactivated, and allows the cellular processes that they carry out when active to be more easily studied.

The consequences of the constitutive activation of GTP-binding proteins include stimulation of phosphoinositide hydrolysis, cyclic AMP accumulation or elimination, and activation of specific proto-oncogenes. The ^{35}S labelled radioligand of the compound, ^{35}SGTPγS, is used in autoradiography and G-protein binding studies.
