= Symmetric dimethylarginine =

Names
- IUPAC name (2S)-2-amino-5-[(N,N'-dimethylcarbamimidoyl)amino]pentanoic acid
- Other names N^{ω},N^{ω'}-dimethyl-L-arginine

Identifiers
CAS Number	30344-00-4
3D model (JSmol)	Interactive image
Beilstein Reference	973080
ChEBI	CHEBI:25682
ChemSpider	147942
DrugBank	DB02302
PubChem CID	169148
UNII	49787G1ULV
CompTox Dashboard (EPA)	DTXSID00952691
- InChI: InChI=1S/C8H18N4O2/c1-10-8(11-2)12-5-3-4-6(9)7(13)14/h6H,3-5,9H2,1-2H3,(H,13,14)(H2,10,11,12)/t6-/m0/s1 Key: HVPFXCBJHIIJGS-LURJTMIESA-N
- SMILES: C(C[C@@H](C(=O)O)N)CNC(=NC)NC

Properties
Chemical formula	C_{8}H_{18}N_{4}O_{2}
Molar mass	202.258 g·mol^{−1}
- Except where otherwise noted, data are given for materials in their standard state (at 25 °C [77 °F], 100 kPa). Infobox references

Symmetric dimethylarginine (SDMA) is produced during catabolism of proteins. It consists of an arginine core, with one methyl group on each of the two terminal side-chain nitrogen atoms.

Dimethylation of arginine in proteins is mediated by various enzymes, including protein arginine methyltransferase 5 as part of a regulatory pathway of transcription.

SDMA has been explored as a possible biomarker for kidney disease in cats and dogs.
