= STX10 =

Protein-coding gene in the species Homo sapiens

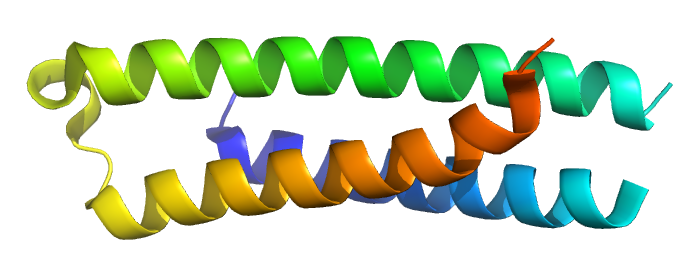

Identifiers
- Aliases: STX10, SYN10, hsyn10, syntaxin 10
- External IDs: OMIM: 603765; GeneCards: STX10
Available structures
PDB	Human UniProt search: PDBe RCSB
PDB	List of PDB id codes 4DND

Gene location (Human)
Chr.	Chromosome 19 (human)
Band	19p13.13	Start	13,144,058 bp
Band	19p13.13	End	13,150,383 bp
RNA expression pattern
Bgee	Human / Mouse (ortholog); Top expressed in: monocyte; granulocyte; mucosa of transverse colon; stromal cell of endometrium; blood; right hemisphere of cerebellum; apex of heart; canal of the cervix; right lung; body of stomach / n/a; More reference expression data
BioGPS	n/a
Gene ontology
Molecular function	SNAP receptor activity; syntaxin binding; protein binding; SNARE binding
Cellular component	integral component of membrane; perinuclear region of cytoplasm; vesicle; Golgi membrane; trans-Golgi network; Golgi apparatus; SNARE complex; membrane; trans-Golgi network membrane; cytosol; synaptic vesicle; endomembrane system; integral component of synaptic vesicle membrane; intracellular anatomical structure
Biological process	early endosome to Golgi transport; protein transport; vesicle docking; intracellular protein transport; vesicle fusion; retrograde transport, endosome to Golgi; Golgi vesicle transport; vesicle-mediated transport; regulation of protein localization; membrane fusion
Sources:Amigo / QuickGO
Orthologs
Databases	NCBI: entry; OMA: entry
Species	Human	Mouse
Entrez	8677	n/a
Ensembl	ENSG00000104915	n/a
UniProt	O60499	n/a
RefSeq (mRNA)	NM_001271609; NM_001271610; NM_001271611; NM_003765	n/a
RefSeq (protein)	NP_001258538; NP_001258539; NP_001258540; NP_003756	n/a
Location (UCSC)	Chr 19: 13.14 – 13.15 Mb	n/a
PubMed search		n/a
- Wikidata
View/Edit Human

Syntaxin-10 (STX10) is a SNARE protein that is encoded by the STX10 gene. This protein is found in most vertebrates (including humans) but is noticeably absent from mice. As with other SNARE proteins, STX10 facilitates vesicle fusion and thus is important for intracellular trafficking of proteins and other cellular components. More specifically, STX10 has been implicated in endosome to Golgi trafficking of the mannose 6-phosphate receptor and glucose transporter type 4.

STX10 has been detected in the trans-Golgi network (TGN) by immunofluorescence.

== Structure and function ==
Human STX10 is a 249 amino acid protein that has three N-terminal α-helices and a single SNARE domain followed by a single-pass transmembrane domain. Human STX10 is 60% identical to human STX6.

STX10 is structurally classified as a Qc-SNARE (contributes a glutamine (Q) residue in the formation of the assembled core SNARE complex) and is functionally classified as a t-SNARE (or target-SNARE which is often located in the membranes of target compartments).

== Interactions ==
STX10 is known to interact with the t-SNAREs VTI1A and STX16 and with the v-SNAREs VAMP3 and VAMP4. The SNARE complex of STX10, STX16, VTI1A, and VAMP3 are required for late endosome to Golgi trafficking of the mannose 6-phosphate receptor. Early endosome to Golgi trafficking of Shiga toxin requires the SNARE complex of STX6, STX16, VTI1A, and VAMP3 or VAMP4.

Thus, STX10 distinguishes early endosome to Golgi trafficking from late endosome to Golgi trafficking.
