= Vesicle-associated membrane protein =

Protein family

Synaptobrevin
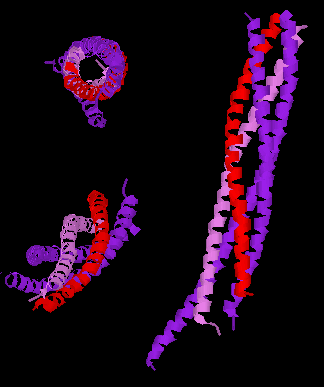
- Three different views of the high resolution structure of a truncated neuronal SNARE complex. Legend: synaptobrevin-2 (red), Syntaxin-1 (pink), SNAP-25 (purple).

Identifiers
- Symbol: Synaptobrevin
- Pfam: PF00957
- InterPro: IPR016444
- PROSITE: PDOC00368
- SCOP2: 1sfc / SCOPe / SUPFAM
- OPM superfamily: 197
- OPM protein: 4wy4
- Membranome: 198
Available protein structures:
- PDB: IPR016444 PF00957 (ECOD; PDBsum)
- AlphaFold: IPR016444; PF00957

Hypothetic models of VAMP2 conformations and engagement in SNARE complex assembly for neurotransmitter release

Vesicle associated membrane proteins (VAMPs) are a family of SNARE proteins with similar structure, and are mostly involved in vesicle fusion.

- VAMP1 and VAMP2 proteins known as synaptobrevins are expressed in brain and are constituents of the synaptic vesicles, where they participate in neurotransmitter release.
- VAMP3 (known as cellubrevin) is ubiquitously expressed and participates in regulated and constitutive exocytosis as a constituent of secretory granules and secretory vesicles.
- VAMP5 and VAMP7 participate in constitutive exocytosis.
  - VAMP5 is a constituent of secretory vesicles, myotubes and tubulovesicular structures.
  - VAMP7 is found both in secretory granules and endosomes.
- VAMP8 (known as endobrevin) participates in endocytosis and is found in early endosomes. VAMP8 also participates the regulated exocytosis in pancreatic acinar cells.
- VAMP4 is involved in transport from the Golgi.
