= Synaptobrevin =

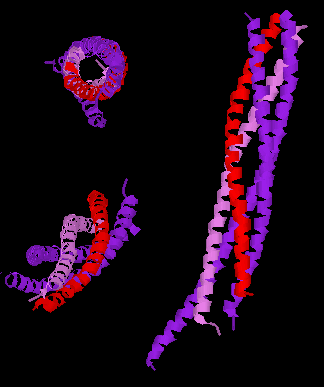
- Three different views of the high resolution structure of a truncated neuronal SNARE complex. Legend: synaptobrevin-2 (red), Syntaxin-1 (pink), SNAP-25 (purple).

Identifiers
- Symbol: Synaptobrevin
- Pfam: PF00957
- InterPro: IPR016444
- PROSITE: PDOC00368
- SCOP2: 1sfc / SCOPe / SUPFAM
- OPM superfamily: 197
- OPM protein: 4wy4
- Membranome: 351
Available protein structures:
- PDB: IPR016444 PF00957 (ECOD; PDBsum)
- AlphaFold: IPR016444; PF00957

Synaptobrevins (synaptobrevin isotypes 1-2, also called VAMP1 and VAMP2) are small integral membrane proteins of secretory vesicles with molecular weight of 18 kilodalton (kDa) that are part of the vesicle-associated membrane protein (VAMP) family.

Synaptobrevin is one of the SNARE proteins involved in formation of the SNARE complexes.

== Structure ==
Out of four α-helices of the core SNARE complex one is contributed by synaptobrevin, one by syntaxin, and two by SNAP-25 (in neurons).

== Function ==
SNARE proteins are the key components of the molecular machinery that drives fusion of membranes in exocytosis. Their function however is subject to fine-tuning by various regulatory proteins collectively referred to as SNARE masters.

== Classification ==
In the Q/R nomenclature for organizing SNARE proteins, VAMP/synaptobrevin family members are classified as R-SNAREs, so named for the presence of an arginine at a specific location within the primary sequence of the protein (as opposed to the SNAREs of the target membrane, which contain a glutamine and are so named Q-SNAREs). Synaptobrevin is classified as a V-SNARE in the V/T nomenclature, an alternative classification scheme in which SNAREs are classified as V-SNAREs and T-SNAREs for their localization to vesicles and target membranes, respectively.

== Clinical significance ==
Synaptobrevin is degraded by tetanospasmin, a protein derived from the bacterium Clostridium tetani, which causes tetanus. A related bacterium, Clostridium botulinum, produces the botulinum toxin. Various botulinum toxin serotypes exist that each cleave specific peptide bonds of specific neuronal SNARE proteins, and synaptobrevin is this target protein for several of the serotypes.

== Human proteins containing this domain ==
SEC22A; SEC22B; VAMP1; VAMP2; VAMP3; VAMP4; VAMP5; VAMP7; VAMP8; YKT6;
