= Blood vessel epicardial substance =

Protein involved in cell adhesion, cell motility and vesicular transport

POPDC1

Identifiers
- Aliases: POPDC1, HBVES, POP1, LGMD2X, blood vessel epicardial substance, CARICK, LGMDR25, BVES
- External IDs: OMIM: 604577; MGI: 1346013; GeneCards: POPDC1

Gene location (Human)
Chr.	Chromosome 6 (human)
Band	6q21	Start	105,096,822 bp
Band	6q21	End	105,137,157 bp

Gene location (Mouse)
Chr.	Chromosome 10 (mouse)
Band	10 B2|10 23.47 cM	Start	45,211,868 bp
Band	10 B2|10 23.47 cM	End	45,248,575 bp
RNA expression pattern
Bgee	Human / Mouse (ortholog); Top expressed in: myocardium of left ventricle; tibialis anterior muscle; cardiac muscle tissue of right atrium; deltoid muscle; vastus lateralis muscle; Skeletal muscle tissue of rectus abdominis; biceps brachii; Skeletal muscle tissue of biceps brachii; right ventricle; gastrocnemius muscle / Top expressed in: interventricular septum; ventricle of the heart; atrium; atrioventricular valve; right atrium; left ventricle; temporal muscle; myocardium of ventricle; gastrocnemius muscle; extraocular muscle; More reference expression data
BioGPS	n/a
Gene ontology
Molecular function	cAMP binding; structural molecule activity; protein binding; nucleotide binding
Cellular component	integral component of membrane; lateral plasma membrane; membrane; bicellular tight junction; sarcolemma; caveola; cell junction; plasma membrane; cell projection membrane
Biological process	muscle organ development; epithelial cell-cell adhesion; multicellular organism development; development of the heart; cell adhesion; skeletal muscle tissue development; positive regulation of receptor recycling; regulation of heart rate; hematopoietic progenitor cell differentiation; response to ischemia; regulation of cell shape; vesicle-mediated transport; substrate adhesion-dependent cell spreading; positive regulation of locomotion; regulation of membrane potential; regulation of GTPase activity; vesicle docking; sinoatrial node cell development; cell migration involved in heart development; regulation of endocytic recycling; striated muscle cell differentiation
Sources:Amigo / QuickGO
Orthologs
Databases	NCBI: entry; OMA: entry
Species	Human	Mouse
Entrez	11149	23828
Ensembl	ENSG00000112276	ENSMUSG00000071317
UniProt	Q8NE79	Q9ES83
RefSeq (mRNA)	NM_001199563; NM_007073; NM_147147	NM_024285
RefSeq (protein)	NP_001186492; NP_009004; NP_671488	NP_077247
Location (UCSC)	Chr 6: 105.1 – 105.14 Mb	Chr 10: 45.21 – 45.25 Mb
PubMed search
- Wikidata
View/Edit Human	View/Edit Mouse

Blood vessel epicardial substance (BVES) also known as popeye domain-containing protein 1 (POPDC1) is a protein that is encoded by the POPDC1 gene in humans.

Bves is a highly conserved, transmembrane protein that is involved in cell adhesion, cell motility, and most recently has been shown to play a role in vesicular transport. Bves is found in a wide variety of organisms (from flies to humans) and is a member of the evolutionarily conserved Popdc family of proteins. Although the precise molecular function of Bves is unknown, disruption of this protein results in developmental defects and impaired cellular processes fundamental to living organisms.

== Discovery ==
Bves was discovered simultaneously by two independent labs in 1999 (Bves was also named Popdc1 at the time of discovery; the current accepted convention is Bves). Although initially isolated from cardiac tissue, it was later revealed that Bves is highly expressed in muscle, epithelial and brain tissue. Most studies have focused on determining the function of Bves in epithelial tissue at the cellular level.

== Gene family ==
Bves is the most studied member of the Popeye domain containing (Popdc) family of genes. The two other members of this family are Popdc2 and Popdc3. Popdc2 and Popdc3 are only found in higher vertebrates and share 50% of their DNA sequence, whereas Bves is only 25% homologous with the evolutionary younger Popdc family members. All three members of the Popdc family contain the highly conserved Popeye domain as the family was named for this specific protein motif.

== Structure ==
Bves is a three-pass transmembrane protein with a short extracellular N-terminus (~40aa) and a larger intracellular C-terminus (~250aa). Within the C-terminus is the Popeye domain, which has been postulated to be important for Bves function. The Popeye domain shares no homology with any known protein motifs, and specific function of this domain is currently unknown, although it is highly conserved across species. Bves exists as a homodimer in vivo, and homodimerization has been shown to be important for function.

== Localization/expression ==
Bves is expressed in muscle, epithelial and brain tissue, and is thus found in many adult organs. During development, Bves is detected in all three germ layers and later localizes to the aforementioned tissues. Subcellular localization is present at the plasma membrane and is also seen in punctate, intracellular vesicles. Bves demonstrates dynamic localization, dependent upon cell-cell junction formation. Prior to cell-cell contact, Bves is localized mostly to intracellular vesicles, but as cells begin to form associations, Bves is also present at points of cell-cell contact.

== Interacting proteins ==
Bves interacts with GEFT, a protein that modulates Rho GTPases, Rac1 and Cdc42, which are important for cell motility through modulation of the actin cytoskeleton. Bves also interacts with VAMP3, a SNARE protein important for vesicle fusion. Additionally, Bves has been shown to interact with the tight junction protein, ZO1, although this interaction is most likely via a protein complex, as a direct physical interaction has never been demonstrated.

== Function ==
Disruption of Bves results in a wide range of cellular and developmental phenotypes. Grossly, cell motility and cell adhesion are impaired. Only recently have the molecular mechanisms underlying the function of Bves been uncovered.

=== Modulation of Rho GTPases ===
Bves has been shown to interact and co-localize with GEFT, a modulator of Rho GTPase signaling cascades. Disruption of Bves results in decreased cell speed and increased cell roundness, which are cell processes modulated by the Rho GTPases, Rac1 and Cdc42. Accordingly, Bves disruption results in decreased active Rac1 and Cdc42. Taken together, these data demonstrate that Bves modulates Rho GTPase signaling cascades through interaction with GEFT to affect cell movement and morphology.

=== Regulation of vesicular transport ===
Bves has been shown to interact with VAMP3, a member of the SNARE complex that facilitates vesicle fusion. VAMP3 is important for recycling of integrins during cell migration and is also necessary for exocytosis of transferrin. Upon Bves disruption, cell rounding is increased, a phenotype indicative of decreased adhesion and disruption of integrin function. Accordingly, Bves disruption results in impaired integrin recycling, phenocopying the result seen with inhibition of VAMP3. Similarly, disruption of either Bves results in impaired transferrin recycling again, mimicking the result seen with disruption of VAMP3. Thus, Bves is important for VAMP3-mediated vesicular transport underlying cell migration and transferrin recycling.

=== Silencing in malignancy ===
Bves is silenced by promoter hypermethylation in malignancy. Bves is underexpressed in colon, lung, and breast cancer. In colon cancer this occurs very early during tumorigenesis, with Bves underexpression first noted in premalignant adenomas.
