= SNAP23 =

Protein-coding gene in humans

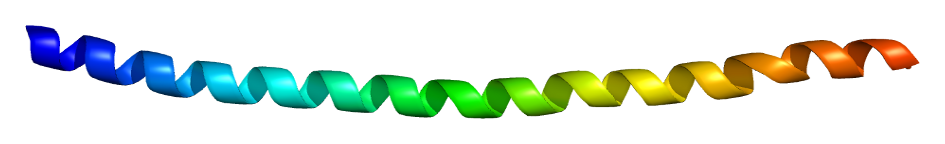

Identifiers
- Aliases: SNAP23, HsT17016, SNAP-23, SNAP23A, SNAP23B, synaptosome associated protein 23kDa, synaptosome associated protein 23
- External IDs: OMIM: 602534; MGI: 109356; GeneCards: SNAP23
Available structures
PDB	Ortholog search: PDBe RCSB
PDB	List of PDB id codes 1NHL, 3ZUS

Gene location (Human)
Chr.	Chromosome 15 (human)
Band	15q15.1-q15.2	Start	42,491,233 bp
Band	15q15.1-q15.2	End	42,545,356 bp

Gene location (Mouse)
Chr.	Chromosome 2 (mouse)
Band	2 60.37 cM|2 E5	Start	120,398,152 bp
Band	2 60.37 cM|2 E5	End	120,431,736 bp
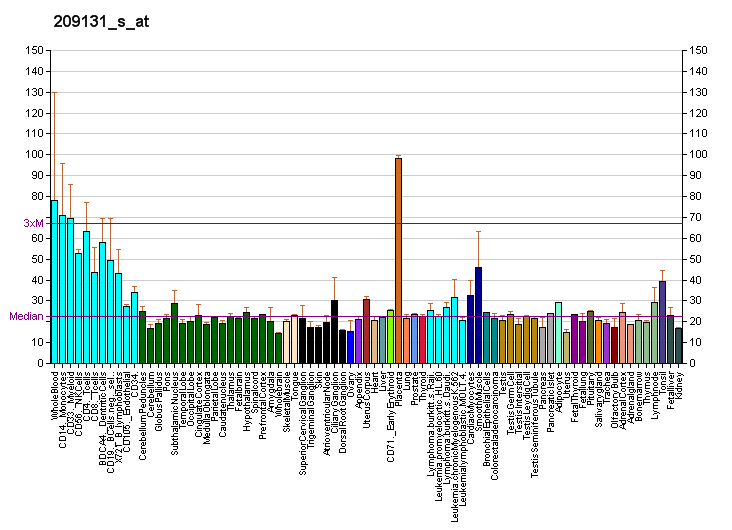

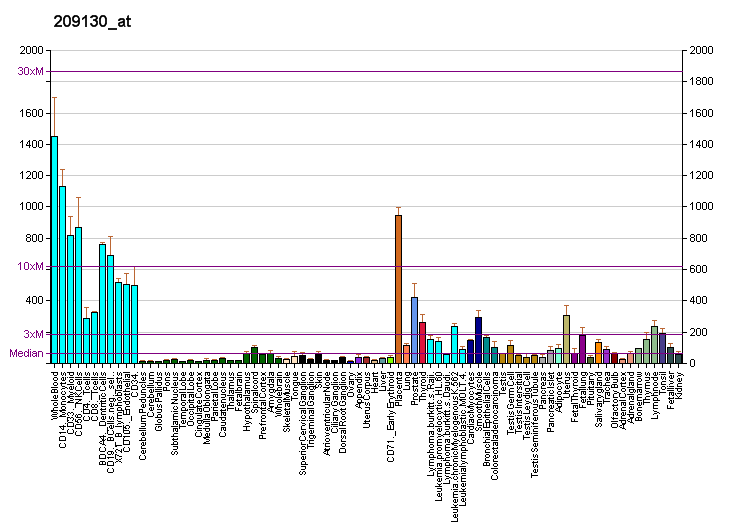

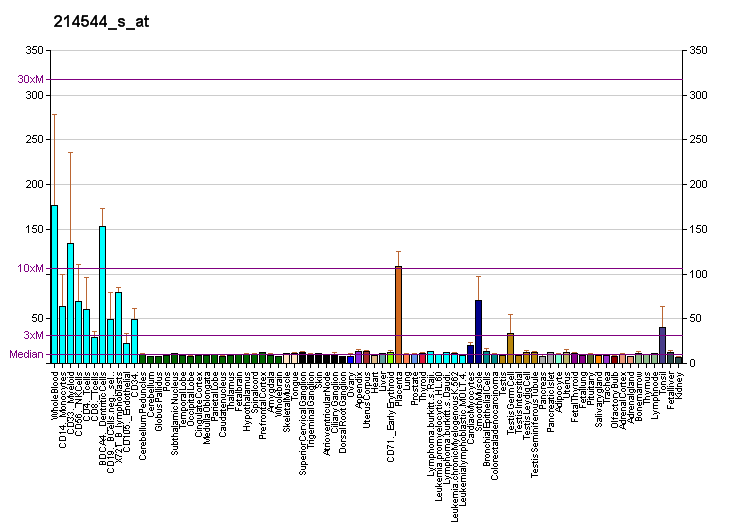
RNA expression pattern
Bgee	Human / Mouse (ortholog); Top expressed in: monocyte; jejunal mucosa; mucosa of sigmoid colon; epithelium of nasopharynx; epithelium of colon; lower lobe of lung; placenta; Achilles tendon; blood; superficial temporal artery / Top expressed in: ascending aorta; aortic valve; tail of embryo; blood; granulocyte; yolk sac; genital tubercle; right kidney; sternocleidomastoid muscle; seminal vesicula; More reference expression data
BioGPS	More reference expression data
Gene ontology
Molecular function	SNAP receptor activity; protein binding; syntaxin binding
Cellular component	cytoplasm; membrane; focal adhesion; plasma membrane; synapse; nucleoplasm; cell junction; SNARE complex; azurophil granule; specific granule; neuron projection; extracellular exosome; presynapse; mast cell granule; phagocytic vesicle membrane; specific granule membrane; tertiary granule membrane
Biological process	histamine secretion by mast cell; vesicle targeting; synaptic vesicle fusion to presynaptic active zone membrane; membrane fusion; post-Golgi vesicle-mediated transport; synaptic vesicle priming; protein transport; antigen processing and presentation of exogenous peptide antigen via MHC class I, TAP-dependent; neutrophil degranulation; transport; exocytosis; vesicle fusion
Sources:Amigo / QuickGO
Orthologs
Databases	NCBI: entry; OMA: entry
Species	Human	Mouse
Entrez	8773	20619
Ensembl	ENSG00000092531	ENSMUSG00000027287
UniProt	O00161	O09044
RefSeq (mRNA)	NM_003825; NM_130798	NM_001177792; NM_001177793; NM_009222
RefSeq (protein)	NP_003816; NP_570710	NP_001171263; NP_001171264; NP_033248
Location (UCSC)	Chr 15: 42.49 – 42.55 Mb	Chr 2: 120.4 – 120.43 Mb
PubMed search
- Wikidata
View/Edit Human	View/Edit Mouse

Synaptosomal-associated protein 23 is a protein that in humans is encoded by the SNAP23 gene. Two alternative transcript variants encoding different protein isoforms have been described for this gene.

== Function ==
Specificity of vesicular transport is regulated, in part, by the interaction of a vesicle-associated membrane protein termed synaptobrevin/VAMP with a target compartment membrane protein termed syntaxin. These proteins, together with SNAP25 (synaptosome-associated protein of 25 kDa), form a complex which serves as a binding site for the general membrane fusion machinery. Synaptobrevin/VAMP and syntaxin are believed to be involved in vesicular transport in most, if not all cells, while SNAP25 is present almost exclusively in the brain, suggesting that a ubiquitously expressed homolog of SNAP25 exists to facilitate transport vesicle/target membrane fusion in other tissues.

SNAP23 is structurally and functionally similar to SNAP25 and binds tightly to multiple syntaxins and synaptobrevins/VAMPs. It is an essential component of the high affinity receptor for the general membrane fusion machinery and is an important regulator of transport vesicle docking and fusion.

== Clinical significance ==
In individuals with insulin resistance, SNAP23 is found to be translocated from the plasma membrane to the cytosol where it becomes associated with lipid droplets and is therefore unable to translocate GLUT-4 to the membrane, hindering glucose transport.

== Interactions ==
SNAP23 has been shown to interact with:

- Cystic fibrosis transmembrane conductance regulator,
- KIF5B,
- NAPA,
- SNAPAP,
- STX11,
- STX1A,
- STX2,
- STX4,
- STX6,
- SYBL1,
- Syntaxin 3,
- VAMP2,
- VAMP3, and
- Vesicle-associated membrane protein 8.
