= Tetanus toxin =

Extremely potent neurotoxin

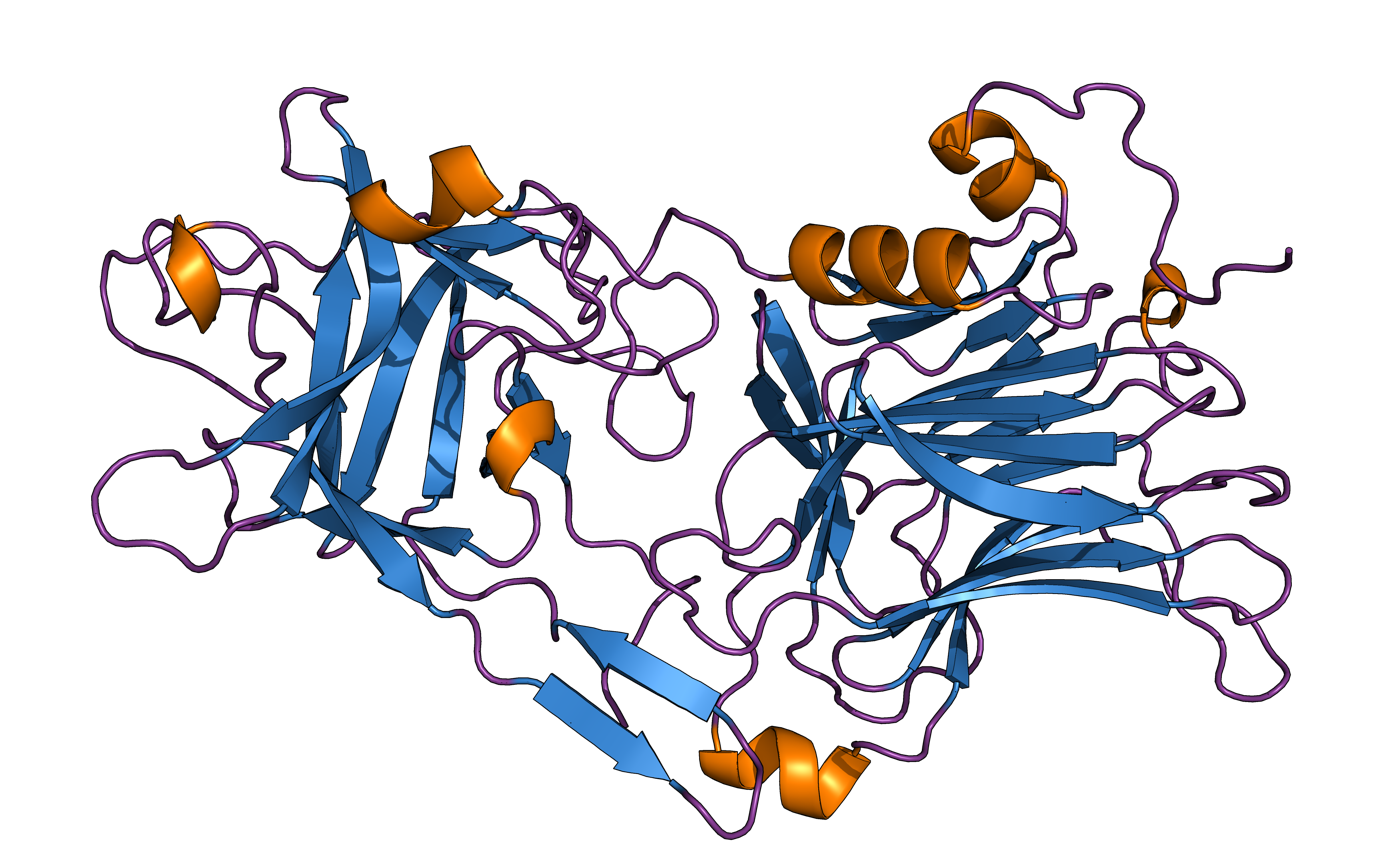
- Tetanus Toxin Heavy Chain C Fragment (PDB: 1a8d)

Identifiers
- Organism: Clostridium tetani E88
- Symbol: tetX
- Entrez: 24255210
- RefSeq (Prot): WP_011100836.1
- UniProt: P04958

Other data
- Chromosome: Genomic: 0.07 - 0.07 Mb
Search for
- Structures: Swiss-model
- Domains: InterPro

Tentoxilysin

Identifiers
- EC no.: 3.4.24.68
- CAS no.: 107231-12-9

Databases
- IntEnz: IntEnz view
- BRENDA: BRENDA entry
- ExPASy: NiceZyme view
- KEGG: KEGG entry
- MetaCyc: metabolic pathway
- PRIAM: profile
- PDB structures: RCSB PDB PDBe PDBsum
Search
- PMC: articles
- PubMed: articles
- NCBI: proteins

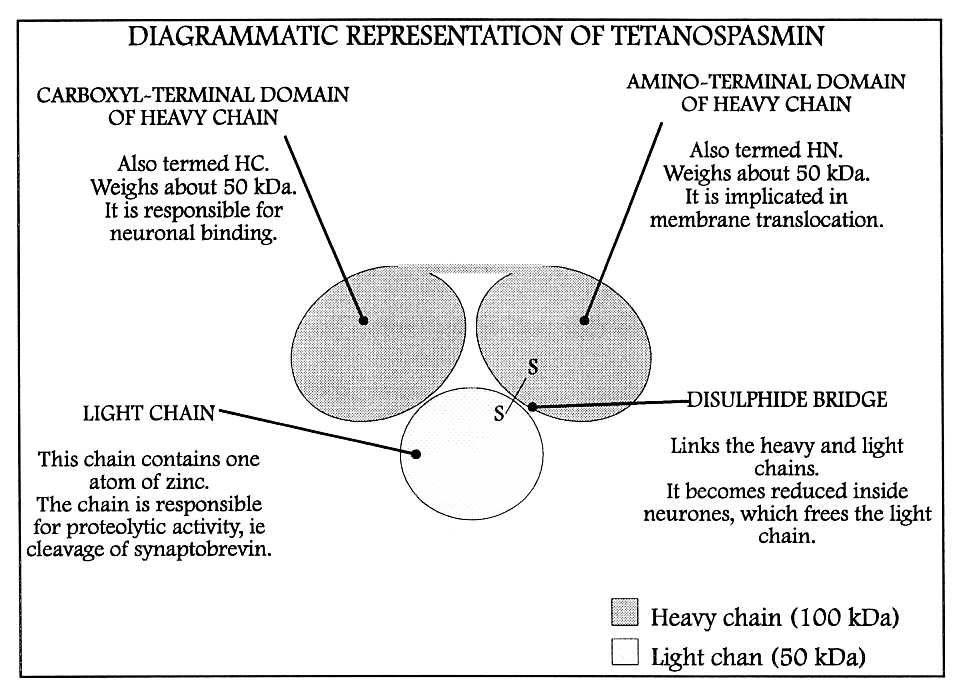
Structure of tetanospasmin

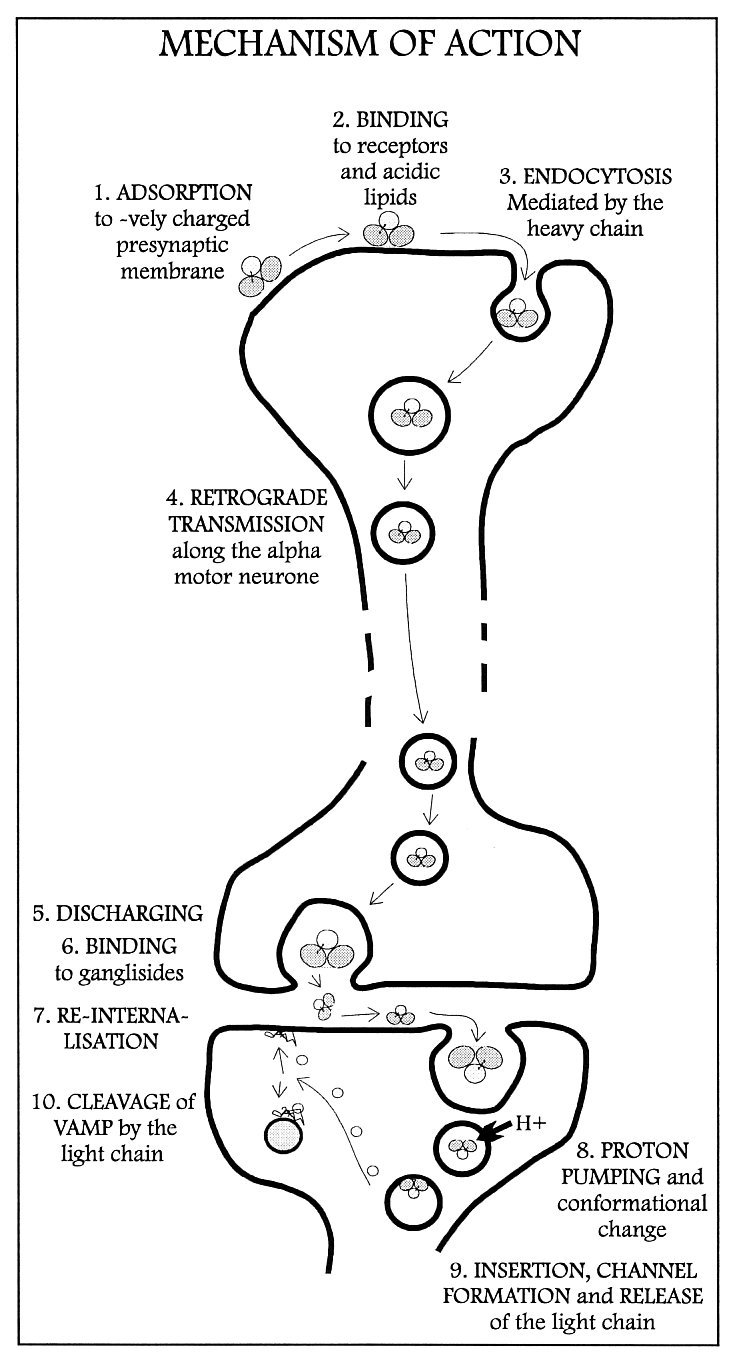
Mechanism of action of tetanospasmin

Tetanus toxin (TeNT) is an extremely potent neurotoxin produced by the vegetative cell of Clostridium tetani in anaerobic conditions, causing tetanus. It has no known function for clostridia in the soil environment where they are normally encountered. It is also called spasmogenic toxin, tentoxilysin, tetanospasmin, or tetanus neurotoxin. The LD_{50} of this toxin has been measured to be approximately 2.5–3 ng/kg, making it second only to the related botulinum toxin (LD_{50} 2 ng/kg) as the deadliest toxin in the world. However, these tests are conducted solely on mice, which may react to the toxin differently from humans and other animals.

C. tetani also produces the exotoxin tetanolysin, a hemolysin, that causes destruction of tissues.

== Distribution ==
Tetanus toxin spreads through tissue spaces into the lymphatic and vascular systems. It enters the nervous system at the neuromuscular junctions and migrates through nerve trunks and into the central nervous system (CNS) by retrograde axonal transport by using dyneins.

== Structure ==
The tetanus toxin protein has a molecular weight of 150 kDa. It is translated from the tetX gene as one protein which is subsequently cleaved into two parts: a 100 kDa heavy or B-chain and a 50 kDa light or A-chain. The chains are connected by a disulfide bond.

- The B-chain binds to disialogangliosides (GD2 and GD1b) on the neuronal membrane and contains a translocation domain which aids the movement of the protein across that membrane and into the neuron.
- The A-chain, an M27-family zinc endopeptidase, attacks the vesicle-associated membrane protein (VAMP).

The TetX gene encoding this protein is located on the PE88 plasmid.

Several structures of the binding domain and the peptidase domain have been solved by X-ray crystallography and deposited in the PDB.

== Mechanism of action ==
The mechanism of TeNT action can be broken down and discussed in these different steps:

Transport
1. Specific binding in the periphery neurons
2. Retrograde axonal transport to the CNS inhibitory interneurons
3. Transcytosis from the axon into the inhibitory interneurons
Action
1. Temperature- and pH-mediated translocation of the light chain into the cytosol
2. Reduction of the disulfide bridge to thiols, severing the link between the light and heavy chain
3. Cleavage of synaptobrevin at -Gln^{76}-Phe- bond

The first three steps outline the travel of tetanus toxin from the peripheral nervous system to where it is taken up to the CNS and has its final effect. The last three steps document the changes necessary for the final mechanism of the neurotoxin.

Transport to the CNS inhibitory interneurons begins with the B-chain mediating the neurospecific binding of TeNT to the nerve terminal membrane. It binds to GT1b polysialogangliosides, similarly to the C. botulinum neurotoxin. It also binds to another poorly characterized GPI-anchored protein receptor more specific to TeNT. Both the ganglioside and the GPI-anchored protein are located in lipid microdomains and both are requisite for specific TeNT binding. Once it is bound, the neurotoxin is then endocytosed into the nerve and begins to travel through the axon to the spinal neurons. The next step, transcytosis from the axon into the CNS inhibitory interneuron, is one of the least understood parts of TeNT action. At least two pathways are involved, one that relies on the recycling of synaptic vesicle 2 (SV2) system and one that does not.

Once the vesicle is in the inhibitory interneuron, its translocation is mediated by pH and temperature, specifically a low or acidic pH in the vesicle and standard physiological temperatures. Once the toxin has been translocated into the cytosol, chemical reduction of the disulfide bond to separate thiols occurs, mainly by the enzyme NADPH-thioredoxin reductase-thioredoxin. The light chain is then free to cleave the Gln76-Phe77 bond of synaptobrevin. Cleavage of synaptobrevin affects the stability of the SNARE core by restricting it from entering the low-energy conformation, which is the target for NSF binding. Synaptobrevin is an integral V-SNARE necessary for vesicle fusion to membranes. The final target of TeNT is the cleavage of synaptobrevin and, even in low doses, has the effect of interfering with exocytosis of neurotransmitters from inhibitory interneurons. The blockage of the neurotransmitters γ-aminobutyric acid (GABA) and glycine is the direct cause of the physiological effects that TeNT induces. GABA inhibits motor neurons, so by blocking GABA, tetanus toxin causes violent spastic paralysis. The action of the A-chain also stops the affected neurons from releasing excitatory transmitters, by degrading the protein synaptobrevin 2. The combined consequence is dangerous overactivity in the muscles from the smallest sensory stimuli, as the damping of motor reflexes is inhibited, leading to generalized contractions of the agonist and antagonist musculature, termed a "tetanic spasm".

== Clinical significance ==
The clinical manifestations of tetanus are caused when tetanus toxin blocks inhibitory impulses, by interfering with the release of neurotransmitters, including glycine and gamma-aminobutyric acid. These inhibitory neurotransmitters inhibit the alpha motor neurons. With diminished inhibition, the resting firing rate of the alpha motor neuron increases, producing rigidity, unopposed muscle contraction and spasm. Characteristic features are risus sardonicus (a rigid smile), trismus (commonly known as "lock-jaw"), and opisthotonus (rigid, arched back). Seizures may occur, and the autonomic nervous system may also be affected. Tetanospasmin appears to prevent the release of neurotransmitters by selectively cleaving a component of synaptic vesicles called synaptobrevin II. Loss of inhibition also affects preganglionic sympathetic neurons in the lateral gray matter of the spinal cord and produces sympathetic hyperactivity and high circulating catecholamine levels. Hypertension and tachycardia alternating with hypotension and bradycardia may develop.

Tetanic spasms can occur in a distinctive form called opisthotonos and be sufficiently severe to fracture long bones. The shorter nerves are the first to be inhibited, which leads to the characteristic early symptoms in the face and jaw, risus sardonicus and lockjaw.

== Immunity and vaccination ==
Due to its extreme potency, even a lethal dose of tetanospasmin may be insufficient to provoke an immune response. Naturally acquired tetanus infections thus do not usually provide immunity to subsequent infections. Immunization (which is impermanent and must be repeated periodically) instead uses the less deadly toxoid derived from the toxin, as in the tetanus vaccine and some combination vaccines (such as DTP).
