= Steven A. Johnsen =

American cancer scientist

- Born: 13 January 1977; Fargo, North Dakota
- Education: B.Sc University of Idaho, 1999; Ph.D Mayo Clinic, 2003
- Spouse: Christin Johnsen
- Scientific career
- Fields: Cancer Research; Transcriptional Reprogramming; Epigenetic Regulation in Cancer

Steven A. Johnsen (born 13 January 1977 in Fargo) is an internationally recognized American molecular biologist and cancer researcher whose research has significantly advanced the understanding of transcriptional and epigenetic regulation in cancer. He is the inaugural Scientific Director of the Robert Bosch Center for Tumor Diseases (RBCT) in Stuttgart, Germany. Over two decades, Johnsen has published extensively on enhancer biology, chromatin regulation, and transcriptional reprogramming, with his findings contributing to the development of novel therapeutic strategies for cancers such as pancreatic ductal adenocarcinoma (PDAC), breast cancer, colorectal cancer, and more.

== Early life and education ==
Johnsen was born in Fargo, North Dakota and raised in the Bitterroot Valley of western Montana, where he developed a deep appreciation for nature and a passion for horses.

Johnsen earned his bachelor's degree in molecular biology from the University of Idaho in 1999. He pursued his doctoral studies at the Mayo Clinic in Rochester, Minnesota, where he obtained his Ph.D. in molecular biosciences in 2003 from the Mayo Clinic Graduate School of Biomedical Sciences. His dissertation focused on the transcription factor KLF10 and its role in TGF-beta/Smad signaling, elucidating the regulation of Smad-dependent transcription and its implications for cancer.

=== Postdoctoral training ===
2003–2006: Laboratory of Professor Ingolf Bach at the Center for Molecular Neurobiology Hamburg, Germany, where he explored transcriptional mechanisms and chromatin dynamics. Work was funded by the National Institutes of Health and the Alexander von Humboldt Foundation.

2006–2007: Laboratory of Professor Frank Gannon at the European Molecular Biology Laboratory, then Director of the European Molecular Biology Organization, where he focused on transcriptional networks and the molecular drivers of cancer progression.

=== Academic career ===
==== Professorships ====
Johnsen launched his independent research career as a W1 Assistant Professor in the Institute of Molecular Oncology at the University Medical Center Göttingen (2007–2012), where he began his pioneering studies on chromatin regulation and transcriptional control.

2012–2014: W2 Associate Professor in the Institute for Tumor Biology at the University Medical Center Hamburg-Eppendorf.

2014–2019: W3 Full Professor in the Department of General, Visceral, and Pediatric Surgery at the University Medical Center Göttingen, where he led a research program investigating the role of histone modifications and transcription factors in cancer biology.

==== Mayo Clinic and current role ====
In 2019, Johnsen joined the Mayo Clinic in Rochester, Minnesota, as a full professor in pharmacology and medicine. His research at Mayo Clinic focused on pancreatic cancer, specifically the epigenetic mechanisms driving therapy resistance.

Since 2022, Johnsen has served as the inaugural Scientific Director of the Robert Bosch Center for Tumor Diseases (RBCT), where his group investigates molecular mechanisms controlling cell identity, which the group aims to exploit for improving patient outcomes.

On December 3, 2024, Johnsen was appointed Honorary Professor at the Medical Faculty of the Eberhard Karls University of Tübingen. He currently lectures in the molecular biology curriculum for first year B.Sc. students majoring in Molecular Medicine.

== Research interests and contributions ==
Johnsen has published over 100 papers and has an H-index of 42 (as of May 6, 2025).

=== Epigenetic regulation in cancer ===
Johnsen’s research has provided critical insights into epigenetic mechanisms, particularly the role of histone H2B monoubiquitination (H2Bub1) in transcriptional regulation, cancer progression, and cell identity. His work has demonstrated that H2Bub1 is a central regulator of chromatin dynamics, influencing transcription elongation, enhancer activity, and gene expression in various cellular contexts.

==== Role of H2Bub1 in Differentiation and Cancer ====
His landmark study published in Molecular Cell (2012) back to back with the group of Prof. Moshe Oren revealed how H2Bub1 mediates chromatin transitions during stem cell differentiation and lineage specification. These findings were further supported by extensive in vivo studies demonstrating a state-specific function of the H2B ubiquitin ligase in bone-forming osteoblasts.

==== Cancer-Specific Roles of RNF40 ====
Johnsen’s lab elucidated the functions of the H2Bub1 E3 ligase RNF40 in breast cancer, colorectal cancer, and inflammatory bowel disease (IBD). These studies demonstrated how RNF40-mediated H2Bub1 influences tumor suppressor gene expression, inflammation-associated pathways, and metastasis.

=== Transcriptional reprogramming in pancreatic cancer ===
Since 2017, Johnsen’s research has focused on the transcriptional and epigenetic mechanisms driving pancreatic ductal adenocarcinoma (PDAC), a highly aggressive cancer with limited treatment options. Major contributions include:

==== Interactive Enhancer Hubs (iHUBs) ====
Published in Gut (2023), this study identified highly connected enhancers, or iHUBs, that mediate transcriptional reprogramming and chemoresistance in PDAC.

==== Subtype-Specific Enhancer Programs ====
His team identified the master transcription factors ΔNp63 and GATA6 as the central drivers of the highly aggressive basal-like and more differentiated classical molecular subtypes of pancreatic cancer. These studies go extensively beyond further work and demonstrate critical and differential functions of ΔNp63 and GATA6 in controlling enhancer-promoter interactions and gene expression.

=== Enhancer biology and BRD4 ===
Johnsen has made significant contributions to enhancer biology, particularly the roles of BRD4 and super-enhancers in cancer. His studies published in Nucleic Acids Research and Cell Reports highlight how BRD4 cooperates with transcription factors such as the estrogen receptor or ΔNp63 to activate oncogenic enhancers, promoting tumor growth and metastasis, and cell differentiation.

=== Early research on KLF10 (TIEG) ===
Johnsen’s Ph.D. research focused on KLF10, a transcription factor critical for regulating TGF-beta/Smad signaling. His studies demonstrated how KLF10 represses inhibitory Smad7 to enhance Smad-dependent gene expression, with implications for cancer progression.

== Robert Bosch Center for Tumor Diseases ==
The Robert Bosch Center for Tumor Diseases (RBCT) is a non-profit research institute dedicated to understanding the molecular mechanisms of cancer and improving patient treatment outcomes. Located on the Bosch Health Campus in Stuttgart, Germany, the RBCT collaborates closely with the Robert Bosch Hospital and other research institutions. Funded by the Robert Bosch Foundation, the RBCT focuses on translational research in areas such as epigenetics, transcriptional regulation, and the tumor microenvironment.

Under Johnsen’s leadership, the RBCT has expanded its focus on developing innovative therapies to overcome therapy resistance and improve the molecular stratification of cancer patients.

== Editor activities ==
In addition to serving as a reviewer for most of the major molecular biology and cancer research journals, Johnsen is Associate Editor of the journal NAR Cancer and frequently serves as an ad hoc reviewer for many high level scientific journals such as Nature Cancer, Nature Communications, Cancer Research, Gut, Gastroenterology, Molecular Oncology, and many others.

== Selected publications ==
- Glucocorticoid receptor suppresses GATA6-mediated RNA polymerase II pause release to modulate classical subtype identity in pancreatic cancer (Gut 2025).
- Interactive Enhancer Hubs Mediate Transcriptional Reprogramming in Pancreatic Cancer (Gut, 2023).
- ΔNp63-Dependent Basal-Like Subtype-Specific Enhancers in PDAC (Molecular Cancer Research, 2023).
- H2B Monoubiquitination Controls Stem Cell Differentiation and Transcriptional Elongation (Molecular Cell, 2012).
- BRD4-Dependent Enhancer Regulation in Cancer (Nucleic Acids Research, 2017).
- RNF40-Mediated H2Bub1 in Breast and Colorectal Cancer (Cancer Research, 2021).
- Role of RNF40 in Bone Formation and IBD (Cell Death & Differentiation, 2021).
