= POPDC3 =

Protein-coding gene in the species Homo sapiens

Identifiers
- Aliases: POPDC3, POP3, bA355M14.1, popeye domain containing 3, LGMDR26
- External IDs: OMIM: 605824; MGI: 1930153; GeneCards: POPDC3

Gene location (Human)
Chr.	Chromosome 6 (human)
Band	6q21	Start	105,157,900 bp
Band	6q21	End	105,180,014 bp

Gene location (Mouse)
Chr.	Chromosome 10 (mouse)
Band	10 B2|10 23.35 cM	Start	45,054,194 bp
Band	10 B2|10 23.35 cM	End	45,194,548 bp
RNA expression pattern
Bgee	Human / Mouse (ortholog); Top expressed in: Skeletal muscle tissue of rectus abdominis; biceps brachii; muscle of thigh; vastus lateralis muscle; thoracic diaphragm; gastrocnemius muscle; Skeletal muscle tissue of biceps brachii; glutes; deltoid muscle; triceps brachii muscle / Top expressed in: triceps brachii muscle; temporal muscle; vastus lateralis muscle; sternocleidomastoid muscle; gastrocnemius muscle; digastric muscle; ankle; medial head of gastrocnemius muscle; soleus muscle; lumbar spinal ganglion; More reference expression data
BioGPS	n/a
Gene ontology
Molecular function	cAMP binding; nucleotide binding; molecular function
Cellular component	membrane; integral component of membrane; sarcolemma
Biological process	biological process; regulation of membrane potential; development of the heart; skeletal muscle tissue development; striated muscle cell differentiation
Sources:Amigo / QuickGO
Orthologs
Databases	NCBI: entry; OMA: entry
Species	Human	Mouse
Entrez	64208	78977
Ensembl	ENSG00000132429	ENSMUSG00000019848
UniProt	Q9HBV1	Q9ES81
RefSeq (mRNA)	NM_022361	NM_024286
RefSeq (protein)	NP_071756	NP_077248
Location (UCSC)	Chr 6: 105.16 – 105.18 Mb	Chr 10: 45.05 – 45.19 Mb
PubMed search
- Wikidata
View/Edit Human	View/Edit Mouse

Popeye domain-containing protein 3 is a protein that in humans is encoded by the POPDC3 gene.

== Function ==
This gene encodes a member of the POP family of proteins which contain three putative transmembrane domains. This membrane associated protein is predominantly expressed in skeletal and cardiac muscle, and may have an important function in these tissues.
