= STX1A =

Protein-coding gene in the species Homo sapiens

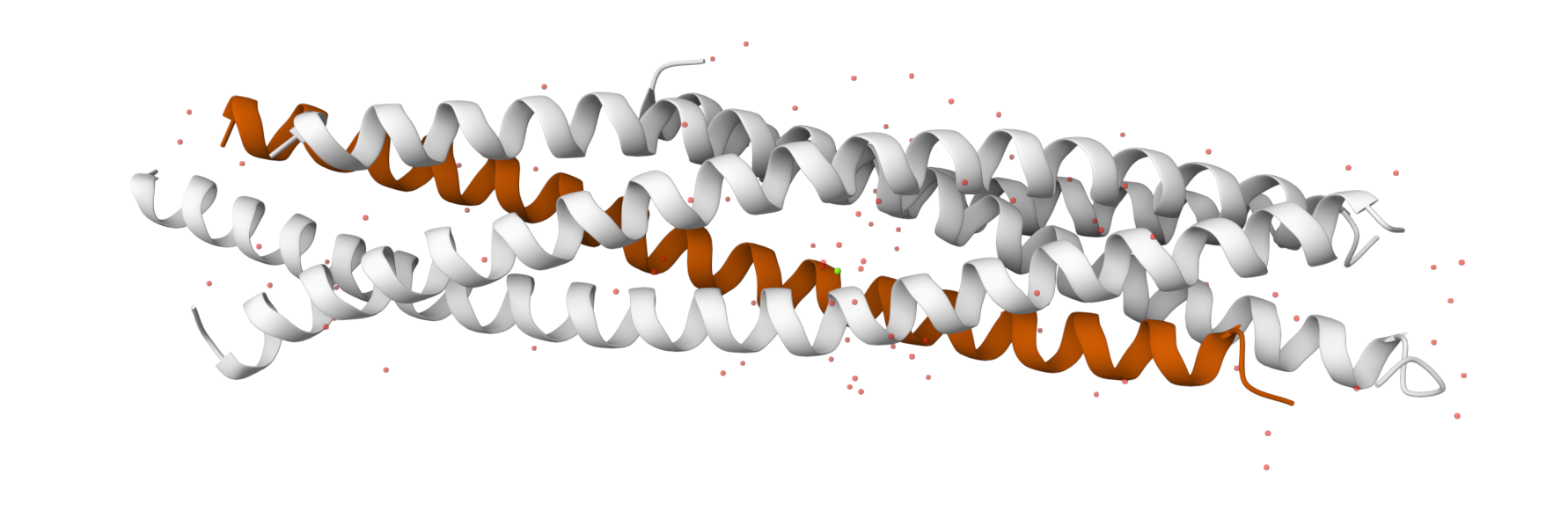

Identifiers
- Aliases: STX1A, HPC-1, P35-1, STX1, SYN1A, syntaxin 1A
- External IDs: OMIM: 186590; MGI: 109355; GeneCards: STX1A

Gene location (Human)
Chr.	Chromosome 7 (human)
Band	7q11.23	Start	73,699,206 bp
Band	7q11.23	End	73,719,672 bp

Gene location (Mouse)
Chr.	Chromosome 5 (mouse)
Band	5|5 G2	Start	135,052,336 bp
Band	5|5 G2	End	135,079,954 bp
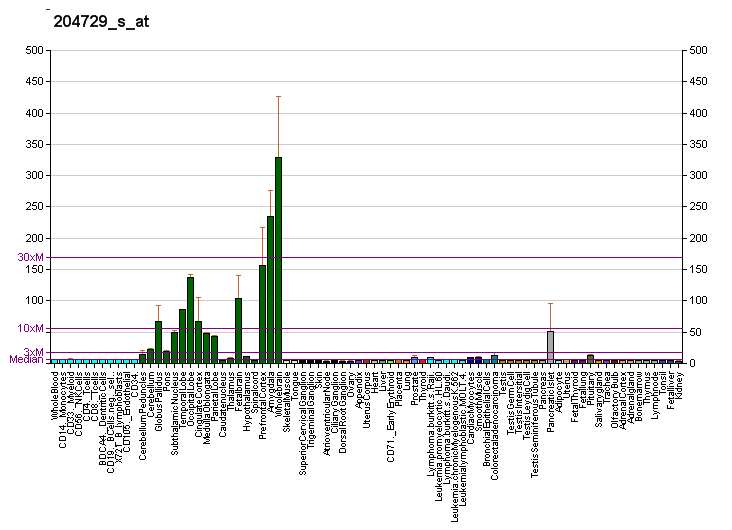
RNA expression pattern
Bgee	Human / Mouse (ortholog); Top expressed in: right frontal lobe; right hemisphere of cerebellum; prefrontal cortex; Brodmann area 10; frontal pole; dorsolateral prefrontal cortex; anterior cingulate cortex; Brodmann area 9; pituitary gland; islet of Langerhans / Top expressed in: barrel cortex; prefrontal cortex; primary motor cortex; piriform cortex; motor neuron; primary visual cortex; renal corpuscle; superior frontal gyrus; perirhinal cortex; trigeminal ganglion; More reference expression data
BioGPS	More reference expression data
Gene ontology
Molecular function	calcium channel inhibitor activity; transmembrane transporter binding; protein N-terminus binding; SNAP receptor activity; kinase binding; chloride channel inhibitor activity; protein heterodimerization activity; SNARE binding; protein binding; myosin binding; protein domain specific binding; protein-macromolecule adaptor activity; myosin head/neck binding; ATP-dependent protein binding; calcium-dependent protein binding
Cellular component	integral component of membrane; cytosol; membrane; synaptic vesicle; synaptobrevin 2-SNAP-25-syntaxin-1a-complexin II complex; voltage-gated potassium channel complex; plasma membrane; synapse; synaptic vesicle membrane; secretory granule; extracellular region; synaptobrevin 2-SNAP-25-syntaxin-1a-complexin I complex; cell junction; SNARE complex; intracellular organelle; neuron projection; synaptobrevin 2-SNAP-25-syntaxin-1a complex; actomyosin; cytoplasmic vesicle; presynaptic membrane; postsynaptic density; presynaptic active zone membrane; nuclear membrane; integral component of plasma membrane; axon; protein-containing complex; acrosomal vesicle; integral component of synaptic vesicle membrane; glutamatergic synapse; integral component of presynaptic membrane; endomembrane system; intracellular anatomical structure
Biological process	exocytosis; positive regulation of norepinephrine secretion; synaptic vesicle docking; secretion by cell; regulation of insulin secretion; positive regulation of catecholamine secretion; positive regulation of neurotransmitter secretion; positive regulation of calcium ion-dependent exocytosis; regulation of exocytosis; response to gravity; vesicle docking; positive regulation of excitatory postsynaptic potential; positive regulation of exocytosis; intracellular protein transport; neurotransmitter transport; vesicle-mediated transport; calcium-ion regulated exocytosis; regulation of synaptic vesicle priming; protein localization to membrane; modulation of excitatory postsynaptic potential; synaptic vesicle fusion to presynaptic active zone membrane; SNARE complex assembly; cytokine-mediated signaling pathway; synaptic vesicle exocytosis; vesicle fusion; neurotransmitter secretion; glutamate secretion; protein sumoylation; insulin secretion; regulated exocytosis; hormone secretion; synaptic vesicle endocytosis; membrane fusion
Sources:Amigo / QuickGO
Orthologs
Databases	NCBI: entry; OMA: entry
Species	Human	Mouse
Entrez	6804	20907
Ensembl	ENSG00000106089	ENSMUSG00000007207
UniProt	Q16623; Q75ME0	O35526
RefSeq (mRNA)	NM_001165903; NM_004603	NM_016801; NM_001359179
RefSeq (protein)	NP_001159375; NP_004594; NP_004594.1	NP_058081; NP_001346108
Location (UCSC)	Chr 7: 73.7 – 73.72 Mb	Chr 5: 135.05 – 135.08 Mb
PubMed search
- Wikidata
View/Edit Human	View/Edit Mouse

Syntaxin-1A is a protein that in humans is encoded by the STX1A gene.

== Function ==
Synaptic vesicles store neurotransmitters that are released during calcium-regulated exocytosis. The specificity of neurotransmitter release requires the localization of both synaptic vesicles and calcium channels to the presynaptic active zone. Syntaxins function in this vesicle fusion process.

Syntaxin-1A is a member of the syntaxin superfamily. Syntaxins are nervous system-specific proteins implicated in the docking of synaptic vesicles with the presynaptic plasma membrane. Syntaxins possess a single C-terminal transmembrane domain, a SNARE [Soluble NSF (N-ethylmaleimide-sensitive fusion protein)-Attachment protein REceptor] domain (known as H3), and an N-terminal regulatory domain (Habc). Syntaxins bind synaptotagmin in a calcium-dependent fashion and interact with voltage dependent calcium and potassium channels via the C-terminal H3 domain. Syntaxin-1A is a key protein in ion channel regulation and synaptic exocytosis.

== Clinical significance ==
Syntaxins serve as a substrate for botulinum neurotoxin type C, a metalloprotease that blocks exocytosis and has high affinity for a molecular complex that includes the alpha-latrotoxin receptor which produces explosive exocytosis.

The expression level of STX1A is directly correlated with intelligence in Williams syndrome.

== Interactive pathway map ==
Click on genes, proteins and metabolites below to link to respective articles. (Note: The interactive pathway map can be edited at WikiPathways: "NicotineDopaminergic_WP1602".)

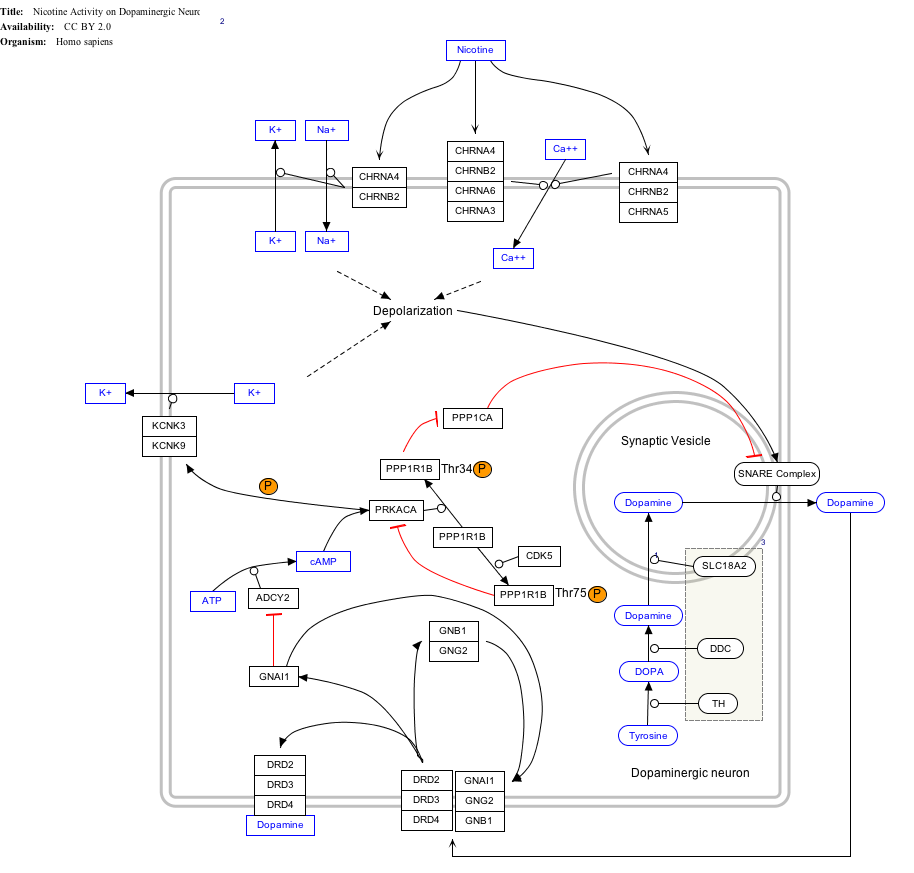

Nicotine Activity on Dopaminergic Neurons edit

== Interactions ==
STX1A has been shown to interact with:

- CPLX1,
- CFTR,
- NAPA,
- RNF40,
- SCNN1G,
- SLC6A1,
- SNAP-25,
- SNAP23,
- STXBP1,
- STXBP5,
- SYT1
- UNC13B,
- VAMP2, and
- VAMP8.

== See also ==
- Syntaxin
