= AP1M1 =

Protein-coding gene in the species Homo sapiens

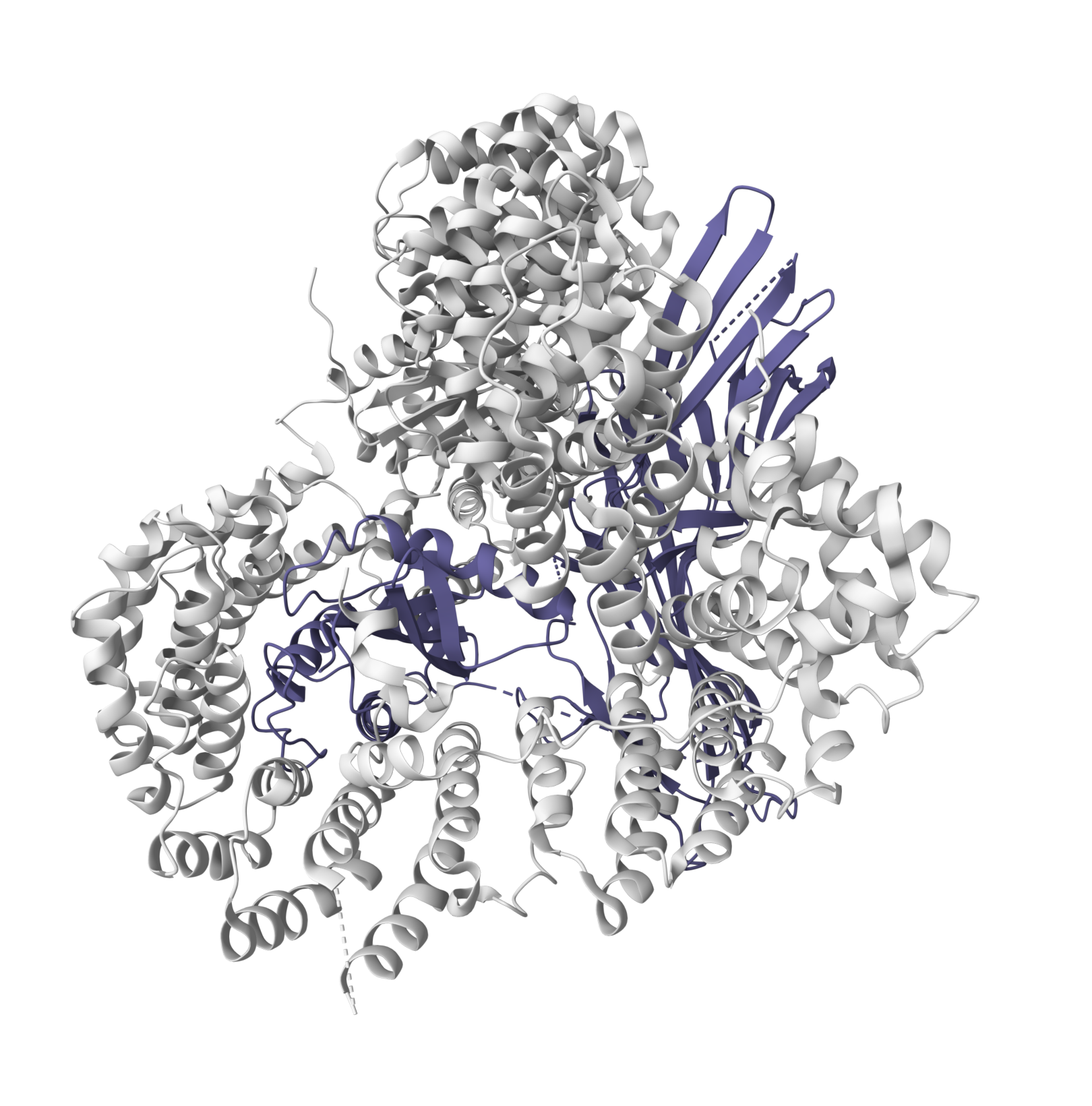

Identifiers
- Aliases: AP1M1, AP47, CLAPM2, CLTNM, MU-1A, adaptor related protein complex 1 mu 1 subunit, adaptor related protein complex 1 subunit mu 1, mu1A
- External IDs: OMIM: 603535; MGI: 102776; GeneCards: AP1M1
Available structures
| PDB | Ortholog search: PDBe RCSB |
| PDB | List of PDB id codes 1W63, 4EMZ, 4EN2, 4HMY, 4P6Z |

Gene location (Human)
| Chr. | Chromosome 19 (human) |
| Band | 19p13.11 | Start | 16,197,854 bp |
| Band | 19p13.11 | End | 16,245,906 bp |

Gene location (Mouse)
| Chr. | Chromosome 8 (mouse) |
| Band | 8 B3.3|8 34.92 cM | Start | 72,993,862 bp |
| Band | 8 B3.3|8 34.92 cM | End | 73,011,229 bp |
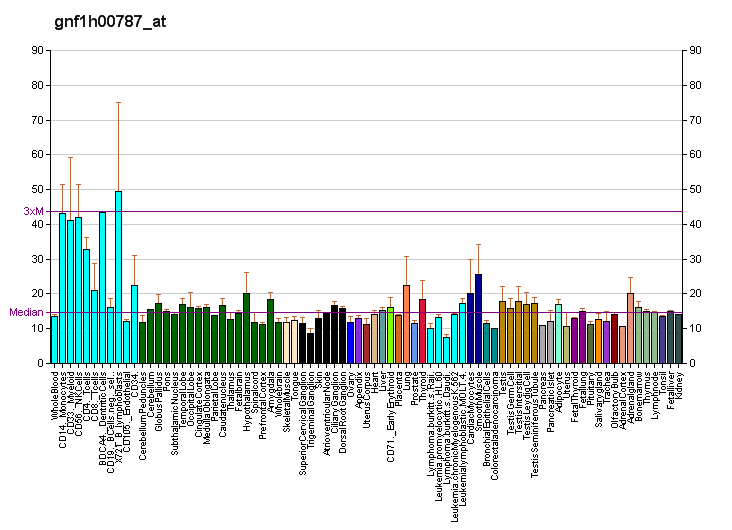
RNA expression pattern
| Bgee | Human / Mouse (ortholog); Top expressed in: granulocyte; right lobe of liver; left testis; right testis; stromal cell of endometrium; prefrontal cortex; mucosa of ileum; monocyte; ganglionic eminence; right coronary artery / Top expressed in: seminiferous tubule; internal carotid artery; external carotid artery; granulocyte; facial motor nucleus; endothelial cell of lymphatic vessel; neural layer of retina; Rostral migratory stream; ganglionic eminence; vas deferens; More reference expression data |
| BioGPS | More reference expression data |
Gene ontology
| Molecular function | protein binding |
| Cellular component | cytosol; clathrin-coated endocytic vesicle membrane; Golgi apparatus; trans-Golgi network membrane; membrane; Golgi membrane; lysosomal membrane; clathrin-coated vesicle membrane; extracellular exosome; cytoplasmic vesicle membrane; cytoplasmic vesicle; clathrin adaptor complex; plasma membrane; specific granule membrane |
| Biological process | antigen processing and presentation of exogenous peptide antigen via MHC class II; mitigation of host defenses by virus; melanosome organization; endosome to melanosome transport; protein transport; intracellular protein transport; vesicle-mediated transport; viral process; neutrophil degranulation; transport |
Sources:Amigo / QuickGO
Orthologs
| Databases | NCBI: entry; OMA: entry |
| Species | Human | Mouse |
| Entrez | 8907 | 11767 |
| Ensembl | ENSG00000072958 | ENSMUSG00000003033 |
| UniProt | Q9BXS5 | P35585 |
| RefSeq (mRNA) | NM_001130524; NM_032493 | NM_007456 |
| RefSeq (protein) | NP_001123996; NP_115882 | NP_031482 |
| Location (UCSC) | Chr 19: 16.2 – 16.25 Mb | Chr 8: 72.99 – 73.01 Mb |
| PubMed search |
- Wikidata
| View/Edit Human | View/Edit Mouse |

AP-1 complex subunit mu-1 is a protein that in humans is encoded by the AP1M1 gene.

== Function ==
The protein encoded by this gene is the medium chain of the trans-Golgi network clathrin-associated protein complex AP-1. The other components of this complex are beta-prime-adaptin, gamma-adaptin, and the small chain AP1S1. This complex is located at the Golgi vesicle and links clathrin to receptors in coated vesicles. These vesicles are involved in endocytosis and Golgi processing.

== Interactions ==
AP1M1 has been shown to interact with VAMP4 and AP1G1.
