= AP3D1 =

Protein-coding gene in the species Homo sapiens

Identifiers
- Aliases: AP3D1, ADTD, hBLVR, adaptor related protein complex 3 delta 1 subunit, HPS10, adaptor related protein complex 3 subunit delta 1
- External IDs: OMIM: 607246; MGI: 107734; GeneCards: AP3D1
Available structures
PDB	Ortholog search: PDBe RCSB
PDB	List of PDB id codes 4AFI

Gene location (Human)
Chr.	Chromosome 19 (human)
Band	19p13.3	Start	2,100,988 bp
Band	19p13.3	End	2,164,468 bp

Gene location (Mouse)
Chr.	Chromosome 10 (mouse)
Band	10 C1|10 39.72 cM	Start	80,542,790 bp
Band	10 C1|10 39.72 cM	End	80,578,098 bp
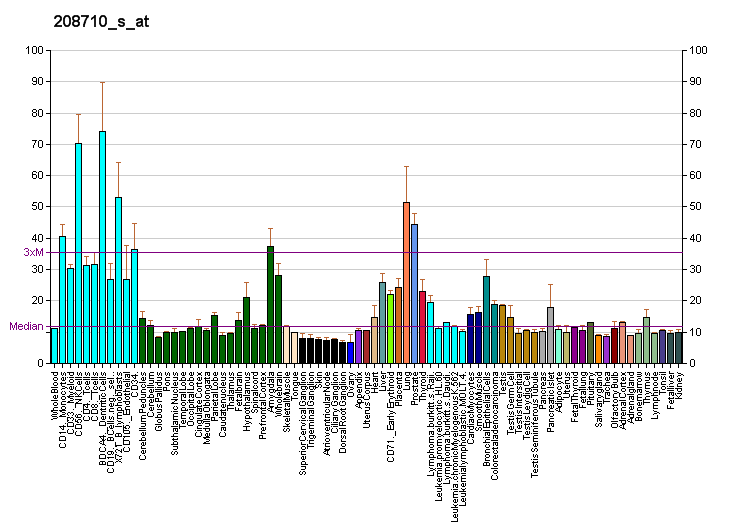

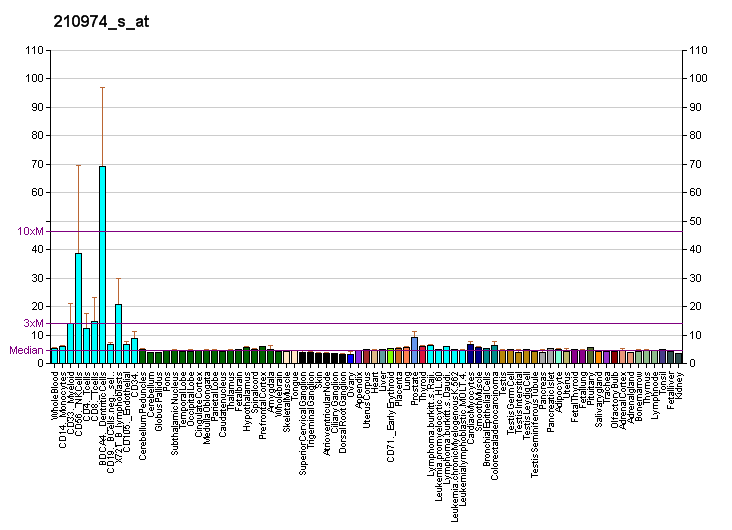

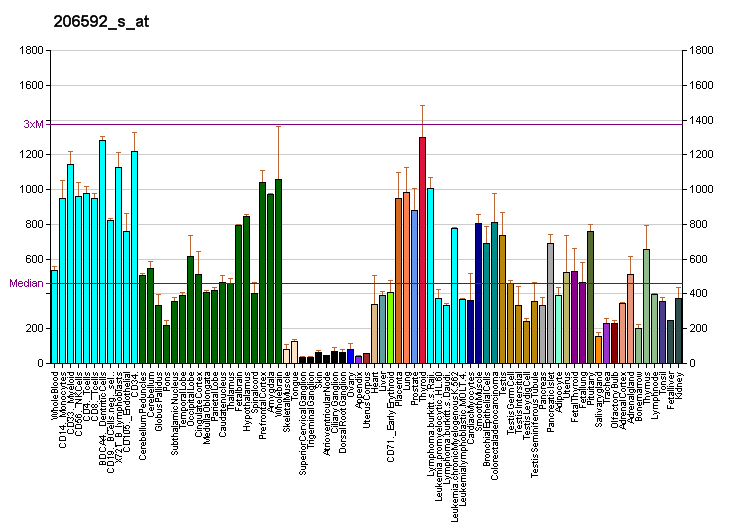
RNA expression pattern
Bgee	Human / Mouse (ortholog); Top expressed in: tendon of biceps brachii; anterior pituitary; lateral nuclear group of thalamus; parotid gland; beta cell; cerebellar vermis; stromal cell of endometrium; pylorus; pars compacta; frontal pole / Top expressed in: Ileal epithelium; vestibular membrane of cochlear duct; anterior amygdaloid area; ventromedial nucleus; facial motor nucleus; arcuate nucleus; habenula; subiculum; medial dorsal nucleus; lateral hypothalamus; More reference expression data
BioGPS	More reference expression data
Gene ontology
Molecular function	transporter activity
Cellular component	cytoplasm; Golgi apparatus; membrane; Golgi membrane; axon; lysosomal membrane; terminal bouton; membrane coat; endosome membrane; axon cytoplasm; AP-3 adaptor complex; presynaptic endosome; plasma membrane; presynapse; postsynapse; glutamatergic synapse
Biological process	protein localization to organelle; protein localization to membrane; antigen processing and presentation; eye pigment biosynthetic process; anterograde axonal transport; melanosome organization; synaptic vesicle membrane organization; endosome to melanosome transport; protein transport; regulation of sequestering of zinc ion; antigen processing and presentation, exogenous lipid antigen via MHC class Ib; positive regulation of NK T cell differentiation; anterograde synaptic vesicle transport; intracellular protein transport; vesicle-mediated transport; synaptic vesicle budding from endosome; neurotransmitter receptor transport, postsynaptic endosome to lysosome; transport; protein targeting to vacuole; Golgi to vacuole transport; vesicle-mediated transport in synapse
Sources:Amigo / QuickGO
Orthologs
Databases	NCBI: entry; OMA: entry
Species	Human	Mouse
Entrez	8943	11776
Ensembl	ENSG00000065000	ENSMUSG00000020198
UniProt	O14617	O54774
RefSeq (mRNA)	NM_001077523; NM_001261826; NM_003938; NM_001374799	NM_007460
RefSeq (protein)	NP_001248755; NP_003929; NP_001361728	NP_031486
Location (UCSC)	Chr 19: 2.1 – 2.16 Mb	Chr 10: 80.54 – 80.58 Mb
PubMed search
- Wikidata
View/Edit Human	View/Edit Mouse

AP-3 complex subunit delta-1 is a protein that in humans is encoded by the AP3D1 gene.

== Function ==
AP3D1 is a subunit of the AP3 adaptor-like complex, which is not associated with clathrin. The AP3D1 subunit is implicated in intracellular biogenesis and trafficking of pigment granules and possibly platelet dense granules and neurotransmitter vesicles.[supplied by OMIM]

== Interactions ==
AP3D1 has been shown to interact with SYBL1.
