= RABAC1 =

Protein-coding gene in the species Homo sapiens

Identifiers
- Aliases: RABAC1, PRA1, PRAF1, YIP3, Rab acceptor 1
- External IDs: OMIM: 604925; MGI: 1201692; HomoloGene: 38182; GeneCards: RABAC1; OMA:RABAC1 - orthologs

Gene location (Human)
Chr.	Chromosome 19 (human)
Band	19q13.2	Start	41,956,681 bp
Band	19q13.2	End	41,959,321 bp

Gene location (Mouse)
Chr.	Chromosome 7 (mouse)
Band	7|7 A3	Start	24,669,177 bp
Band	7|7 A3	End	24,672,179 bp
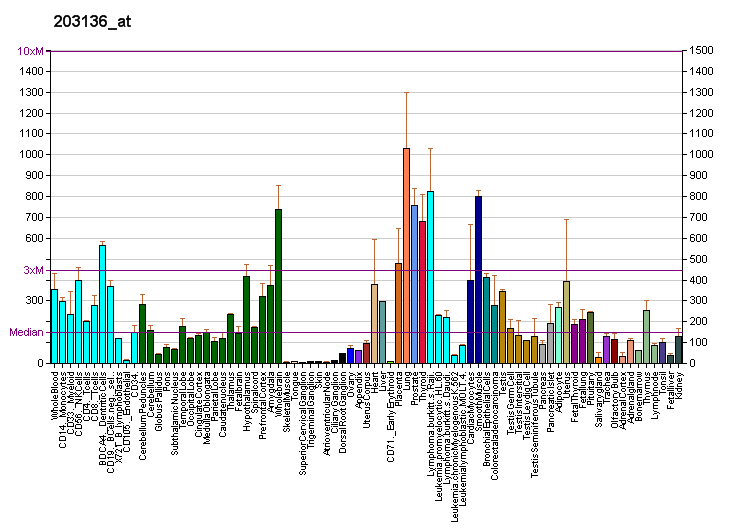
RNA expression pattern
Bgee	Human / Mouse (ortholog); Top expressed in: thoracic aorta; ascending aorta; pituitary gland; anterior pituitary; Descending thoracic aorta; left coronary artery; stromal cell of endometrium; canal of the cervix; body of uterus; hypothalamus / Top expressed in: choroid plexus of fourth ventricle; seminal vesicula; lactiferous gland; CA3 field; perirhinal cortex; parotid gland; central gray substance of midbrain; right lung; right lung lobe; entorhinal cortex; More reference expression data
BioGPS	More reference expression data
Orthologs
Species	Human	Mouse
Entrez	10567	14470
Ensembl	ENSG00000105404	ENSMUSG00000003380
UniProt	Q9UI14	Q9Z0S9
RefSeq (mRNA)	NM_006423	NM_010261
RefSeq (protein)	NP_006414	NP_034391
Location (UCSC)	Chr 19: 41.96 – 41.96 Mb	Chr 7: 24.67 – 24.67 Mb
PubMed search
- Wikidata
View/Edit Human	View/Edit Mouse

RABAC1 is a gene that in humans encodes the protein Prenylated Rab acceptor 1, also called PRA1, PRAF1, or RABAC1. It is highly conserved in eukaryotes. The protein is localized to Golgi and late endosomes, where it plays a role in vesicular trafficking, lipid transport and cell migration.

== Interactions ==
RABAC1 has been shown to interact with numerous prenylated members of the Rab GTPase family and VAMP2.
