= POPDC2 =

Protein-coding gene in the species Homo sapiens

Identifiers
- Aliases: POPDC2, POP2, popeye domain containing 2
- External IDs: OMIM: 605823; MGI: 1930150; HomoloGene: 11147; GeneCards: POPDC2; OMA:POPDC2 - orthologs

Gene location (Human)
Chr.	Chromosome 3 (human)
Band	3q13.33	Start	119,636,457 bp
Band	3q13.33	End	119,665,324 bp

Gene location (Mouse)
Chr.	Chromosome 16 (mouse)
Band	16|16 B3	Start	38,182,571 bp
Band	16|16 B3	End	38,198,578 bp
RNA expression pattern
Bgee	Human / Mouse (ortholog); Top expressed in: apex of heart; right auricle of heart; left ventricle; right ventricle; myocardium of left ventricle; muscle layer of sigmoid colon; cardiac muscle tissue of right atrium; gastrocnemius muscle; muscle of thigh; gallbladder / Top expressed in: interventricular septum; right ventricle; myocardium of ventricle; cardiac muscles; left ventricle; atrium; aortic valve; muscle of thigh; sternocleidomastoid muscle; muscle of arm; More reference expression data
BioGPS	n/a
Gene ontology
Molecular function	molecular function; cAMP binding
Cellular component	integral component of membrane; sarcolemma; plasma membrane; membrane
Biological process	regulation of heart rate; biological process; heart development; skeletal muscle tissue development; regulation of membrane potential; striated muscle cell differentiation
Sources:Amigo / QuickGO
Orthologs
Species	Human	Mouse
Entrez	64091	64082
Ensembl	ENSG00000121577	ENSMUSG00000022803
UniProt	Q9HBU9	Q9ES82
RefSeq (mRNA)	NM_001308333; NM_022135; NM_001369919	NM_001081984; NM_022318
RefSeq (protein)	NP_001295262; NP_071418; NP_001356848	NP_001075453; NP_071713
Location (UCSC)	Chr 3: 119.64 – 119.67 Mb	Chr 16: 38.18 – 38.2 Mb
PubMed search
- Wikidata
View/Edit Human	View/Edit Mouse

Popeye domain-containing protein 2 is a protein that in humans is encoded by the POPDC2 gene.

== Structure ==
This gene encodes a member of the POP family of proteins which contain three putative transmembrane domains. This membrane associated protein is predominantly expressed in skeletal and cardiac muscle. The Popeye domain, which is located in the cytoplasmic part of the protein displays limited sequence homology to other proteins, while sequence conservation amongst Popeye proteins is high and amounts to approximately 40%–60%.

== Function ==
The bacterial CAP or CRP proteins are the closest related non-Popdcproteins. CRP proteins function as cyclic nucleotide-regulated transcription factors that modulate the expression of genes encoding enzymes involved in carbohydrate metabolism. The cyclic AMP-binding domains of these proteins display approximately 25% identity and 60% similarity to the Popeye domain. Significant structural similarity is evident between the Popeye domain and cAMP binding domains of eukaryotic protein kinase A (PKA) and HCN channels.

== Ligands ==
The Popeye domain binds cyclic nucleotides and has a binding affinity (IC_{50}) for cAMP of 120 nM, which is comparable to the affinities reported for PKA (100 nM) and HCN4 (240 nM). One of the interacting proteins is the two-pore potassium (K2P) channel TREK-1. In the presence of Popdc proteins, TREK-1 current is increased. This increase was based on an enhanced membrane representation of TREK-1, suggesting a modulation of channel trafficking by Popdc proteins.

== Animal studies ==
Genetic inactivation of Popdc2 in mice resulted in bradyarrhythmia, which is strictly stress-dependent. At rest a normal ECG was observed. Gene inactivation in the zebrafish also causes a cardiac arrhythmia phenotype and defective skeletal muscle development.
