= SEC22A =

Protein-coding gene in the species Homo sapiens

Identifiers
- Aliases: SEC22A, SEC22L2, SEC22 homolog A, vesicle trafficking protein
- External IDs: OMIM: 612442; MGI: 2447876; HomoloGene: 8246; GeneCards: SEC22A; OMA:SEC22A - orthologs

Gene location (Human)
Chr.	Chromosome 3 (human)
Band	3q21.1	Start	123,201,927 bp
Band	3q21.1	End	123,274,136 bp

Gene location (Mouse)
Chr.	Chromosome 16 (mouse)
Band	16|16 B3	Start	35,131,501 bp
Band	16|16 B3	End	35,184,288 bp
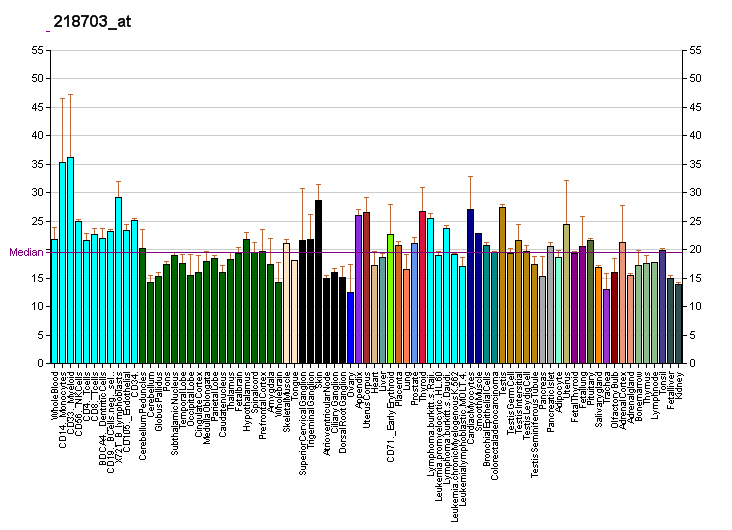
RNA expression pattern
Bgee	Human / Mouse (ortholog); Top expressed in: secondary oocyte; Achilles tendon; islet of Langerhans; gonad; left testis; testicle; right testis; ventricular zone; ganglionic eminence; stromal cell of endometrium / Top expressed in: spermatocyte; medullary collecting duct; primary oocyte; spermatid; secondary oocyte; renal corpuscle; right kidney; epithelium of lens; zygote; interventricular septum; More reference expression data
BioGPS	More reference expression data
Gene ontology
Molecular function	SNAP receptor activity; protein binding; SNARE binding; transporter activity
Cellular component	integral component of membrane; endoplasmic reticulum membrane; endoplasmic reticulum; membrane; SNARE complex
Biological process	protein transport; vesicle-mediated transport; vesicle fusion with Golgi apparatus; exocytosis; endoplasmic reticulum to Golgi vesicle-mediated transport
Sources:Amigo / QuickGO
Orthologs
Species	Human	Mouse
Entrez	26984	317717
Ensembl	ENSG00000121542	ENSMUSG00000034473
UniProt	Q96IW7	Q8BH47
RefSeq (mRNA)	NM_012430	NM_133704
RefSeq (protein)	NP_036562	NP_598465
Location (UCSC)	Chr 3: 123.2 – 123.27 Mb	Chr 16: 35.13 – 35.18 Mb
PubMed search
- Wikidata
View/Edit Human	View/Edit Mouse

Vesicle-trafficking protein SEC22a is a protein that in humans is encoded by the SEC22A gene.

The protein encoded by this gene belongs to the member of the SEC22 family of vesicle trafficking proteins. This protein has similarity to rat SEC22 and may act in the early stages of the secretory pathway. There is evidence for the use of multiple poly A sites in this gene.
