= VAMP1 =

Protein-coding gene in the species Homo sapiens

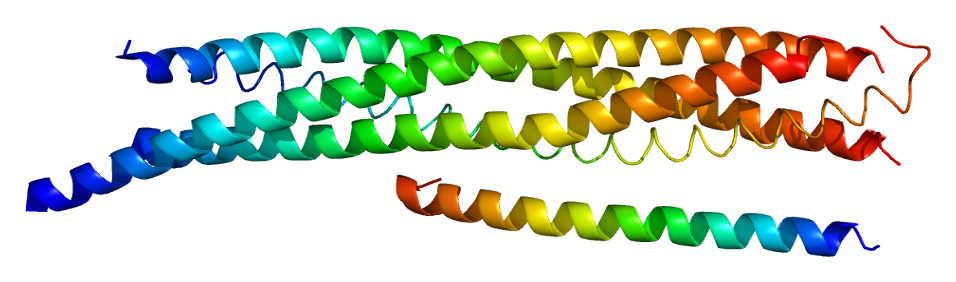

Identifiers
- Aliases: VAMP1, SPAX1, SYB1, VAMP-1, vesicle associated membrane protein 1, CMS25
- External IDs: OMIM: 185880; MGI: 1313276; GeneCards: VAMP1

Gene location (Human)
Chr.	Chromosome 12 (human)
Band	12p13.31	Start	6,462,237 bp
Band	12p13.31	End	6,470,677 bp

Gene location (Mouse)
Chr.	Chromosome 6 (mouse)
Band	6 F3|6 59.32 cM	Start	125,192,514 bp
Band	6 F3|6 59.32 cM	End	125,222,927 bp
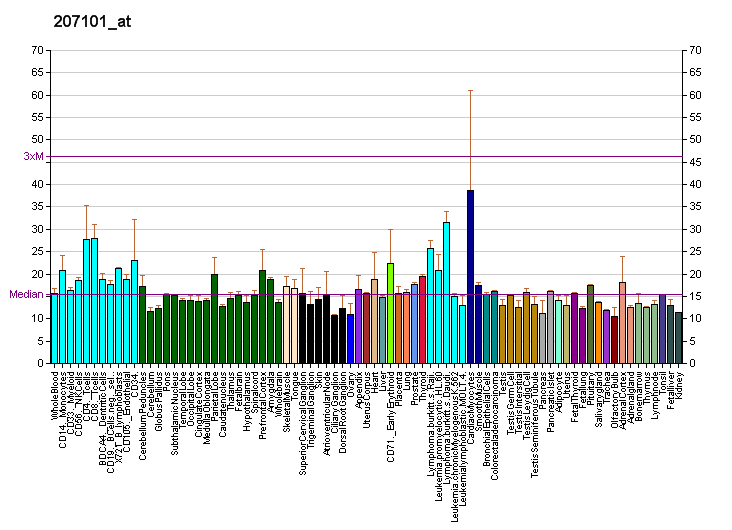

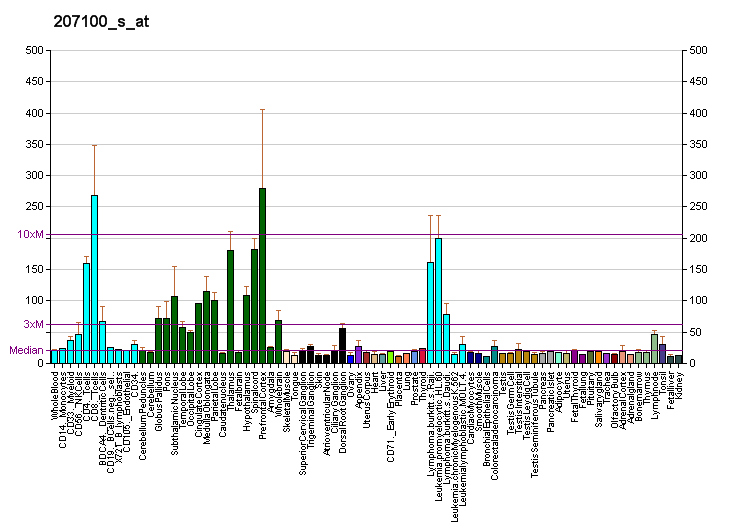

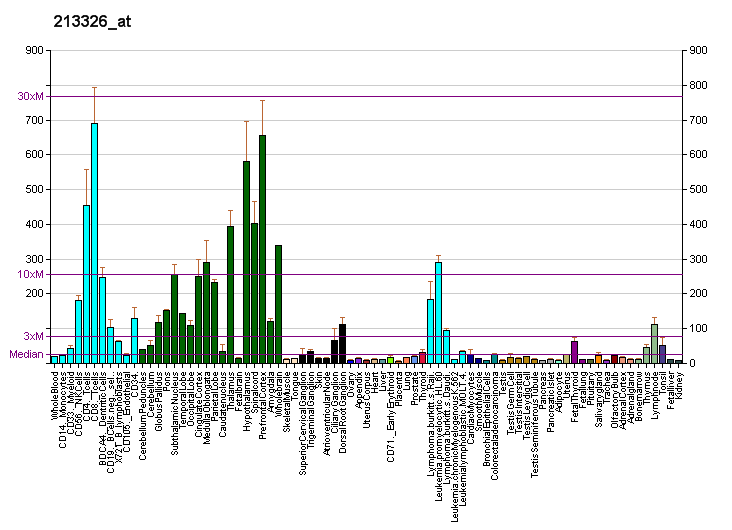
RNA expression pattern
Bgee	Human / Mouse (ortholog); Top expressed in: pons; Brodmann area 23; primary visual cortex; superior vestibular nucleus; lateral nuclear group of thalamus; spinal ganglia; endothelial cell; middle temporal gyrus; dorsal motor nucleus of vagus nerve; inferior olivary nucleus / Top expressed in: pontine nuclei; deep cerebellar nuclei; medulla oblongata; medial vestibular nucleus; anterior horn of spinal cord; dorsal tegmental nucleus; facial motor nucleus; inferior colliculi; lateral geniculate nucleus; superior colliculus; More reference expression data
BioGPS	More reference expression data
Gene ontology
Molecular function	SNAP receptor activity; protein binding; syntaxin binding
Cellular component	synaptic vesicle membrane; synapse; integral component of membrane; mitochondrion; tertiary granule membrane; azurophil granule membrane; cell junction; integral component of plasma membrane; neuron projection; membrane; cell surface; specific granule membrane; mitochondrial outer membrane; cytoplasmic vesicle membrane; cytoplasmic vesicle; cytosol; SNARE complex; integral component of synaptic vesicle membrane; neuromuscular junction; presynapse; glutamatergic synapse
Biological process	SNARE complex assembly; vesicle fusion; vesicle-mediated transport; exocytosis; synaptic vesicle priming; regulation of synaptic vesicle fusion to presynaptic active zone membrane
Sources:Amigo / QuickGO
Orthologs
Databases	NCBI: entry; OMA: entry
Species	Human	Mouse
Entrez	6843	22317
Ensembl	ENSG00000139190	ENSMUSG00000030337
UniProt	P23763	Q62442
RefSeq (mRNA)	NM_001297438; NM_014231; NM_016830; NM_199245	NM_001080557; NM_009496
RefSeq (protein)	NP_001284367; NP_055046; NP_058439; NP_954740	NP_001074026; NP_033522
Location (UCSC)	Chr 12: 6.46 – 6.47 Mb	Chr 6: 125.19 – 125.22 Mb
PubMed search
- Wikidata
View/Edit Human	View/Edit Mouse

Vesicle-associated membrane protein 1 (VAMP1) is a protein that in humans is encoded by the VAMP1 gene.

== Function ==
Synaptobrevins/VAMPs, syntaxins, and the 25-kD synaptosomal-associated protein SNAP25 are the main components of a protein complex involved in the docking and/or fusion of synaptic vesicles with the presynaptic membrane. VAMP1 is a member of the vesicle-associated membrane protein (VAMP)/synaptobrevin family. Multiple alternative splice variants that encode proteins with alternative carboxy ends have been described, but the full-length nature of some variants has not been defined.

== Clinical significance ==
Homozygous mutations in VAMP1 have been identified in a series of children affected with a form of congenital myasthenic syndrome and similar presynaptic features in these patients and the knock-out VAMP1 mouse have been demonstrated.

VAMP1 expression has been linked to higher survival rates for lung cancer patients.

== Interactive pathway map ==
Click on genes, proteins and metabolites below to link to respective articles. (Note: The interactive pathway map can be edited at WikiPathways: "NicotineDopaminergic_WP1602".)

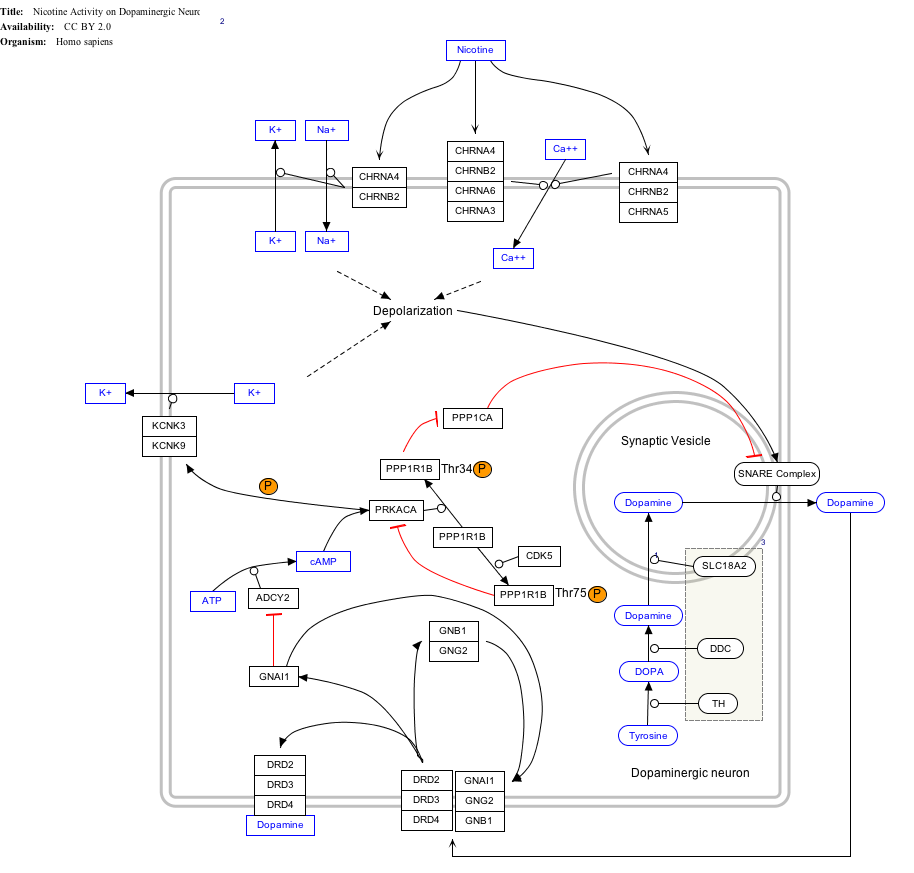

Nicotine Activity on Dopaminergic Neurons edit
