= VAMP5 =

Protein-coding gene in humans

Identifiers
- Aliases: VAMP5, vesicle associated membrane protein 5, Vesicle-associated membrane protein 5
- External IDs: OMIM: 607029; MGI: 1858622; GeneCards: VAMP5

Gene location (Human)
Chr.	Chromosome 2 (human)
Band	2p11.2	Start	85,584,431 bp
Band	2p11.2	End	85,593,406 bp

Gene location (Mouse)
Chr.	Chromosome 6 (mouse)
Band	6|6 C1	Start	72,345,777 bp
Band	6|6 C1	End	72,357,451 bp
RNA expression pattern
Bgee	Human / Mouse (ortholog); Top expressed in: right lung; muscle of thigh; upper lobe of left lung; left adrenal cortex; right adrenal gland; right adrenal cortex; monocyte; left uterine tube; right auricle of heart; granulocyte / Top expressed in: granulocyte; muscle of thigh; spermatocyte; yolk sac; right kidney; lip; esophagus; spermatid; embryo; morula; More reference expression data
BioGPS	n/a
Gene ontology
Molecular function	SNAP receptor activity; protein binding; SNARE binding
Cellular component	integral component of membrane; integral component of organelle membrane; late endosome; Golgi apparatus; membrane; intercalated disc; plasma membrane; integral component of plasma membrane; cell surface; perinuclear region of cytoplasm; extracellular exosome; cytoplasmic vesicle membrane; endomembrane system; SNARE complex; trans-Golgi network
Biological process	cell differentiation; muscle organ development; multicellular organism development; vesicle fusion; skeletal muscle tissue development; vesicle-mediated transport; Golgi to plasma membrane protein transport; exocytosis
Sources:Amigo / QuickGO
Orthologs
Databases	NCBI: entry; OMA: entry
Species	Human	Mouse
Entrez	10791	53620
Ensembl	ENSG00000168899	ENSMUSG00000073002
UniProt	O95183	Q9Z2P8
RefSeq (mRNA)	NM_006634	NM_001080742; NM_016872
RefSeq (protein)	NP_006625	NP_001074211; NP_058568
Location (UCSC)	Chr 2: 85.58 – 85.59 Mb	Chr 6: 72.35 – 72.36 Mb
PubMed search
- Wikidata
View/Edit Human	View/Edit Mouse

Vesicle-associated membrane protein 5 (VAMP-5) is a synaptobrevin protein that in humans is encoded by the VAMP5 gene.

== Function ==
VAMPs (synaptobrevins) along with syntaxins and the 25-kD synaptosomal-associated protein are the main components of a protein complex involved in the docking and/or fusion of vesicles and cell membranes. The VAMP5 gene is a member of the vesicle-associated membrane protein (VAMP)/synaptobrevin family and the SNARE superfamily. This VAMP family member may participate in vesicle trafficking events that are associated with myogenesis.
