= VAMP2 =

Protein-coding gene in the species Homo sapiens

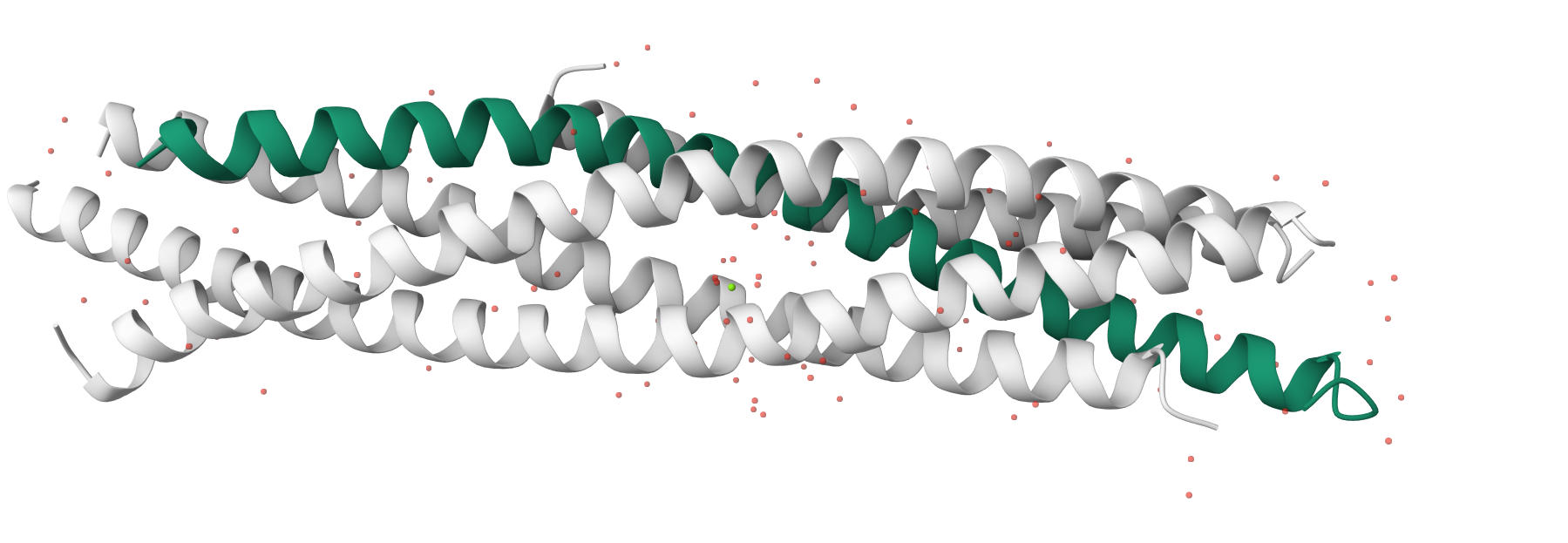

Identifiers
- Aliases: VAMP2, SYB2, VAMP-2, vesicle associated membrane protein 2, NEDHAHM
- External IDs: OMIM: 185881; MGI: 1313277; GeneCards: VAMP2
Available structures
PDB	Ortholog search: PDBe RCSB
PDB	List of PDB id codes 3FIE, 3FII, 3RK2, 3RK3, 3RL0

Gene location (Human)
Chr.	Chromosome 17 (human)
Band	17p13.1	Start	8,159,149 bp
Band	17p13.1	End	8,163,546 bp

Gene location (Mouse)
Chr.	Chromosome 11 (mouse)
Band	11|11 B3	Start	68,979,316 bp
Band	11|11 B3	End	68,983,210 bp
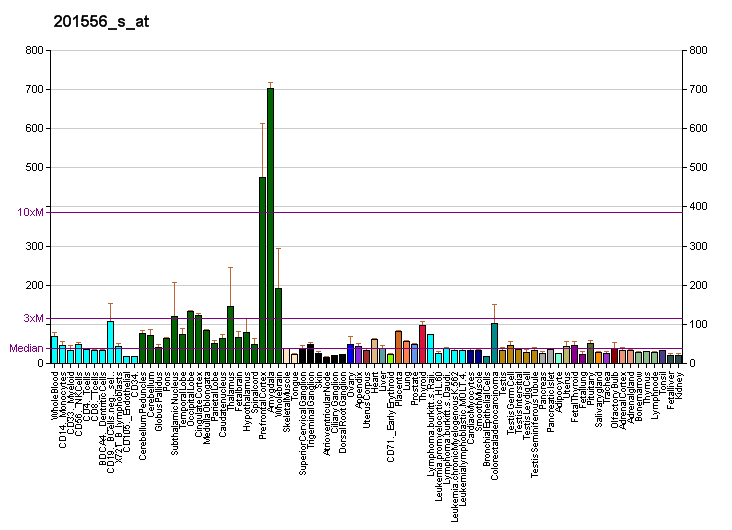

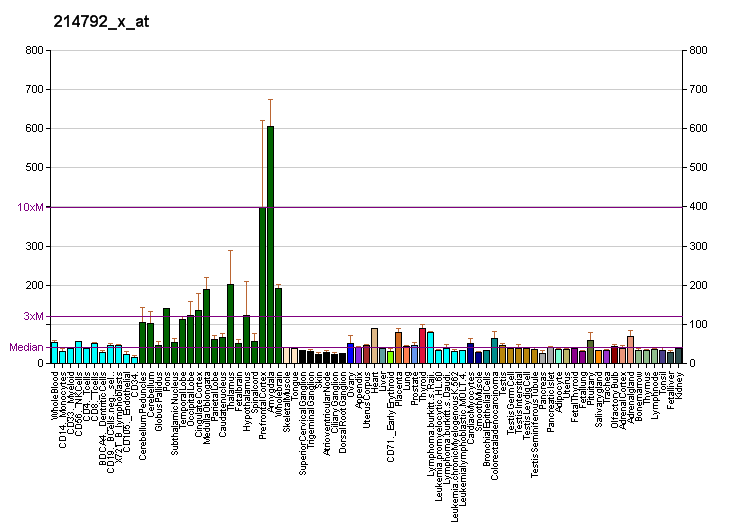

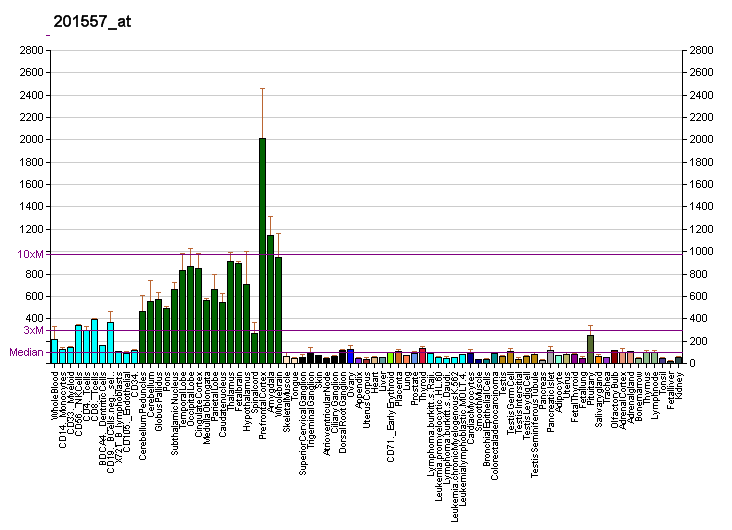
RNA expression pattern
Bgee	Human / Mouse (ortholog); Top expressed in: Brodmann area 10; frontal pole; paraflocculus of cerebellum; right frontal lobe; right hemisphere of cerebellum; cingulate gyrus; anterior cingulate cortex; amygdala; nucleus accumbens; anterior pituitary / Top expressed in: perirhinal cortex; entorhinal cortex; superior frontal gyrus; primary visual cortex; dentate gyrus of hippocampal formation granule cell; neural layer of retina; CA3 field; cerebellar cortex; prefrontal cortex; subiculum; More reference expression data
BioGPS	More reference expression data
Gene ontology
Molecular function	SNAP receptor activity; protein self-association; protein binding; syntaxin-1 binding; SNARE binding; calmodulin binding; syntaxin binding; phospholipid binding; calcium-dependent protein binding
Cellular component	integral component of membrane; cytosol; clathrin-sculpted monoamine transport vesicle membrane; membrane; secretory granule membrane; plasma membrane; clathrin-sculpted gamma-aminobutyric acid transport vesicle membrane; synapse; integral component of plasma membrane; synaptic vesicle membrane; zymogen granule membrane; cell junction; neuron projection; cytoplasmic vesicle; clathrin-coated vesicle; clathrin-sculpted glutamate transport vesicle membrane; secretory granule; intracellular membrane-bounded organelle; synaptobrevin 2-SNAP-25-syntaxin-1a-complexin I complex; synaptobrevin 2-SNAP-25-syntaxin-1a complex; SNARE complex; synaptobrevin 2-SNAP-25-syntaxin-1a-complexin II complex; voltage-gated potassium channel complex; trans-Golgi network; synaptic vesicle; vesicle; perinuclear region of cytoplasm; neuron projection terminus; clathrin-coated vesicle membrane
Biological process	natural killer cell degranulation; mucus secretion; regulation of histamine secretion by mast cell; neutrophil degranulation; glutamate secretion; vesicle fusion; eosinophil degranulation; vesicle-mediated transport; exocytosis; response to glucose; membrane fusion; regulation of delayed rectifier potassium channel activity; calcium-ion regulated exocytosis; regulation of exocytosis; positive regulation of intracellular protein transport; protein transport; Golgi to plasma membrane protein transport; synaptic vesicle exocytosis; cellular response to insulin stimulus; long-term potentiation; regulation of vesicle-mediated transport; membrane organization; protein-containing complex assembly; post-Golgi vesicle-mediated transport; neurotransmitter secretion
Sources:Amigo / QuickGO
Orthologs
Databases	NCBI: entry; OMA: entry
Species	Human	Mouse
Entrez	6844	22318
Ensembl	ENSG00000220205	ENSMUSG00000020894
UniProt	P63027	P63044
RefSeq (mRNA)	NM_014232; NM_001330125	NM_009497
RefSeq (protein)	NP_001317054; NP_055047	NP_033523
Location (UCSC)	Chr 17: 8.16 – 8.16 Mb	Chr 11: 68.98 – 68.98 Mb
PubMed search
- Wikidata
View/Edit Human	View/Edit Mouse

Hypothetic models of VAMP2 conformations and engagement in SNARE complex assembly for neurotransmitter release

Vesicle-associated membrane protein 2 (VAMP2) is a protein that in humans is encoded by the VAMP2 gene.

== Function ==
Synaptobrevins/VAMPs, syntaxins, and the 25-kD synaptosomal-associated protein SNAP25 are the main components of a protein complex involved in the docking and/or fusion of synaptic vesicles with the presynaptic membrane. VAMP2 is a member of the vesicle-associated membrane protein (VAMP)/synaptobrevin family. VAMP2 is thought to participate in neurotransmitter release at a step between docking and fusion. Mice lacking functional synaptobrevin2/VAMP2 gene cannot survive after birth, and have a dramatically reduced synaptic transmission, around 10% of control. The protein forms a stable complex with syntaxin, synaptosomal-associated protein, 25 kD, and complexin. It also forms a distinct complex with synaptophysin.

== Clinical significance ==
Heterozygous mutations in VAMP2 cause a neurodevelopmental disorder with hypotonia and autistic features (with or without hyperkinetic movements).

== Interactions ==
VAMP2 has been shown to interact with:

- RABAC1,
- SNAP-25,
- SNAP23,
- STX1A, and
- STX4.
