= VTI1A =

Protein-coding gene in the species Homo sapiens

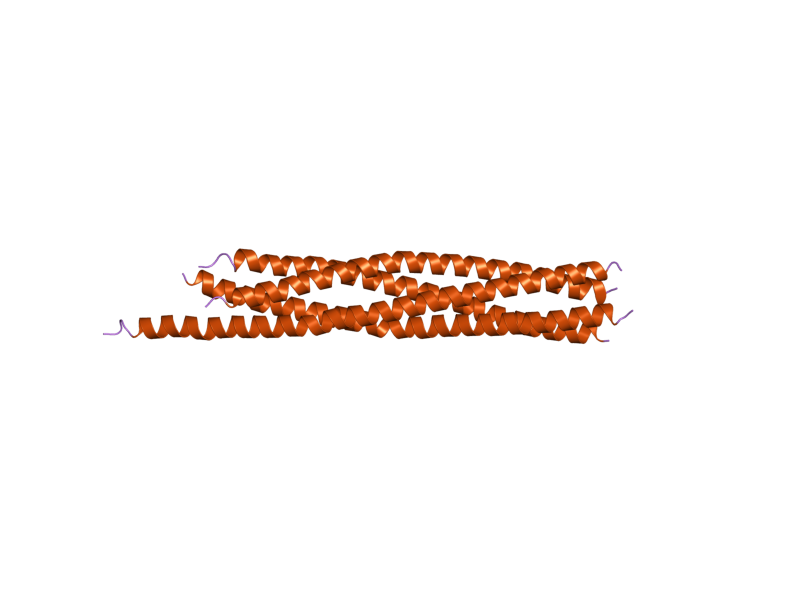

Identifiers
- Aliases: VTI1A, MMDS3, MVti1, VTI1RP2, Vti1-rp2, vesicle transport through interaction with t-SNAREs 1A
- External IDs: OMIM: 614316; MGI: 1855699; HomoloGene: 39963; GeneCards: VTI1A; OMA:VTI1A - orthologs

Gene location (Human)
Chr.	Chromosome 10 (human)
Band	10q25.2	Start	112,446,998 bp
Band	10q25.2	End	112,818,744 bp

Gene location (Mouse)
Chr.	Chromosome 19 (mouse)
Band	19|19 D2	Start	55,304,727 bp
Band	19|19 D2	End	55,615,741 bp
RNA expression pattern
Bgee	Human / Mouse (ortholog); Top expressed in: sural nerve; Achilles tendon; pancreatic ductal cell; buccal mucosa cell; testicle; monocyte; bone marrow cell; corpus callosum; epithelium of colon; blood / Top expressed in: Rostral migratory stream; granulocyte; superior frontal gyrus; right kidney; genital tubercle; dentate gyrus of hippocampal formation granule cell; lumbar subsegment of spinal cord; tail of embryo; medial dorsal nucleus; proximal tubule; More reference expression data
BioGPS	n/a
Gene ontology
Molecular function	SNAP receptor activity; protein binding; SNARE binding
Cellular component	integral component of membrane; endosome; Golgi apparatus; membrane; synaptic vesicle; autophagosome; soma; SNARE complex; perinuclear region of cytoplasm; neuron projection terminus; cytoplasmic vesicle; clathrin-coated vesicle; trans-Golgi network membrane; ER to Golgi transport vesicle membrane; cytosol; Golgi membrane; late endosome membrane; endoplasmic reticulum membrane; intracellular membrane-bounded organelle
Biological process	voluntary musculoskeletal movement; autophagy; retrograde transport, endosome to Golgi; protein transport; intracellular protein transport; Golgi ribbon formation; vesicle-mediated transport; Golgi to vacuole transport; vesicle fusion with Golgi apparatus; intra-Golgi vesicle-mediated transport; endoplasmic reticulum to Golgi vesicle-mediated transport; protein targeting to vacuole
Sources:Amigo / QuickGO
Orthologs
Species	Human	Mouse
Entrez	143187	53611
Ensembl	ENSG00000151532	ENSMUSG00000024983
UniProt	Q96AJ9	O89116
RefSeq (mRNA)	NM_145206; NM_001318203; NM_001318205; NM_001365710; NM_001365711 NM_001365712; NM_001365713; NM_001365714	NM_001293685; NM_001293686; NM_016862; NM_001360431; NM_001360432
RefSeq (protein)	NP_001305132; NP_001305134; NP_660207; NP_001352639; NP_001352640 NP_001352641; NP_001352642; NP_001352643	NP_001280614; NP_001280615; NP_058558; NP_001347360; NP_001347361
Location (UCSC)	Chr 10: 112.45 – 112.82 Mb	Chr 19: 55.3 – 55.62 Mb
PubMed search
- Wikidata
View/Edit Human	View/Edit Mouse

Vesicle transport through interaction with t-SNAREs homolog 1A is a protein that in humans is encoded by the VTI1A gene.

The protein encoded by the VTI1A gene is a vesicular-SNARE (v-SNARE) protein which is located in the membranes of target vesicle compartments.
