= STX6 =

Protein-coding gene in humans

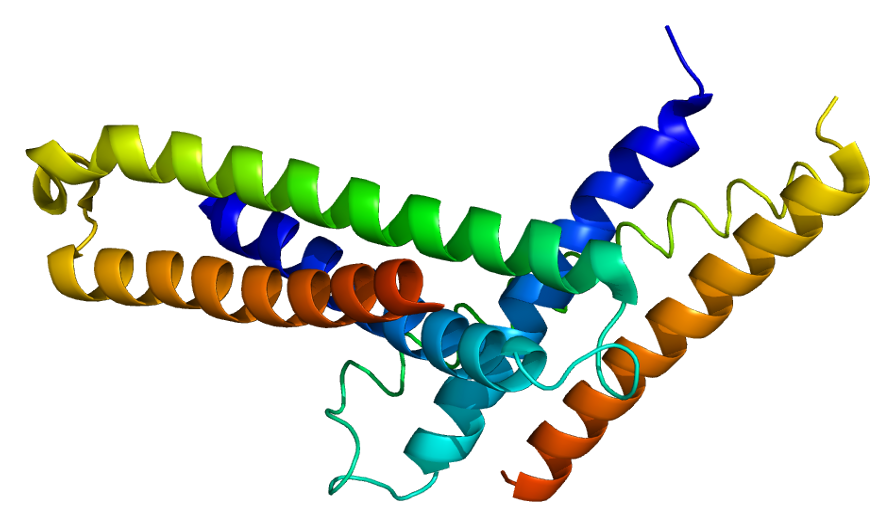

Identifiers
- Aliases: STX6, syntaxin 6
- External IDs: OMIM: 603944; MGI: 1926235; GeneCards: STX6
Available structures
PDB	Ortholog search: PDBe RCSB
PDB	List of PDB id codes 2NPS, 4J2C

Gene location (Human)
Chr.	Chromosome 1 (human)
Band	1q25.3	Start	180,972,712 bp
Band	1q25.3	End	181,023,121 bp

Gene location (Mouse)
Chr.	Chromosome 1 (mouse)
Band	1|1 G3	Start	155,034,461 bp
Band	1|1 G3	End	155,084,002 bp
RNA expression pattern
Bgee	Human / Mouse (ortholog); Top expressed in: secondary oocyte; endothelial cell; gingival epithelium; ganglionic eminence; Brodmann area 23; skin of thigh; skin of hip; monocyte; primary visual cortex; cartilage tissue / Top expressed in: external carotid artery; internal carotid artery; Rostral migratory stream; conjunctival fornix; epithelium of lens; medullary collecting duct; endocardial cushion; hair follicle; left lung lobe; Gonadal ridge; More reference expression data
BioGPS	n/a
Gene ontology
Molecular function	protein binding; syntaxin binding; SNAP receptor activity; SNARE binding
Cellular component	membrane; plasma membrane; SNARE complex; early endosome; phagocytic vesicle; perinuclear region of cytoplasm; clathrin-coated vesicle; trans-Golgi network; integral component of membrane; Golgi membrane; trans-Golgi network membrane; Golgi apparatus; nucleoplasm; cytosol; synaptic vesicle; integral component of synaptic vesicle membrane; endomembrane system
Biological process	endosome organization; regulation of protein localization; vesicle docking; retrograde transport, endosome to Golgi; Golgi vesicle transport; protein transport; vesicle fusion; Golgi ribbon formation; vesicle-mediated transport; intracellular protein transport; endocytic recycling; synaptic vesicle to endosome fusion
Sources:Amigo / QuickGO
Orthologs
Databases	NCBI: entry; OMA: entry
Species	Human	Mouse
Entrez	10228	58244
Ensembl	ENSG00000135823	ENSMUSG00000026470
UniProt	O43752	Q9JKK1
RefSeq (mRNA)	NM_001286210; NM_005819	NM_021433
RefSeq (protein)	NP_001273139; NP_005810	NP_067408
Location (UCSC)	Chr 1: 180.97 – 181.02 Mb	Chr 1: 155.03 – 155.08 Mb
PubMed search
- Wikidata
View/Edit Human	View/Edit Mouse

Syntaxin-6 is a protein that in humans is encoded by the STX6 gene.

== Interactions ==
STX6 has been shown to interact with SNAP23, VAMP3 and VAMP4.

== N terminal protein domain ==
The protein domain Syntaxin 6 N terminal protein domain is a soluble N-ethylmaleimide-sensitive factor attachment protein receptor (SNARE) found in endosomal transport vesicles. It is part of the family, of target SNAREs (t-SNAREs). It is a vital aid to exporting and importing cell cargo through a process called cell trafficking. Its SNARE motif shows significant homology to both syntaxin 1a and S25C, indicating similarity through evolutionary conservation. The structure of the syntaxin 6 N-terminal domain shows strong structural similarity with the N-terminal domains of syntaxin 1a, Sso1p, and Vam3p; despite a very low level of sequence similarity. SNARE functions essentially as a tether to hold the vesicle. The cytoplasmic regions of SNARE found on transport vesicles and target membranes interact, then a four-helix coiled coil forms. This links the cell membrane and vesicles together in such a way that it overcomes the energetic barrier to fusing two lipid bilayers. This is the way cell cargo is exchanged. This particular entry focuses on the N-terminal domain of Syntaxin 6.

=== Structure ===
Members of this entry, which are found in the amino terminus of various SNARE proteins, adopt a structure consisting of an antiparallel three-helix bundle. Their exact function has not been determined, though it is known that they regulate the SNARE motif, as well as mediate various protein-protein interactions involved in membrane-transport.

=== Function ===
SNAREs play a vital role in the trafficking of cell cargo. The vesicles fuse to the cell membrane with the help of SNARE proteins. The SNARE motifs form a four-helix bundle that contributes to the fusion of two membranes. More specifically, the N-terminal domain binds to the SNARE motif, and this intramolecular interaction decreases the rate of association with the partner SNARE. However the N terminal domain's function still remains to fully elucidated.
