= RNF40 =

Protein-coding gene in the species Homo sapiens

Identifiers
- Aliases: RNF40, BRE1B, RBP95, STARING, ring finger protein 40
- External IDs: OMIM: 607700; MGI: 2142048; GeneCards: RNF40
Enzyme activity
EC #	BRENDA	ExPASy	KEGG	MetaCyc
2.3.2.27	↗	↗	↗	↗

Gene location (Human)
Chr.	Chromosome 16 (human)
Band	16p11.2	Start	30,761,745 bp
Band	16p11.2	End	30,776,307 bp

Gene location (Mouse)
Chr.	Chromosome 7 (mouse)
Band	7|7 F3	Start	127,187,939 bp
Band	7|7 F3	End	127,203,971 bp
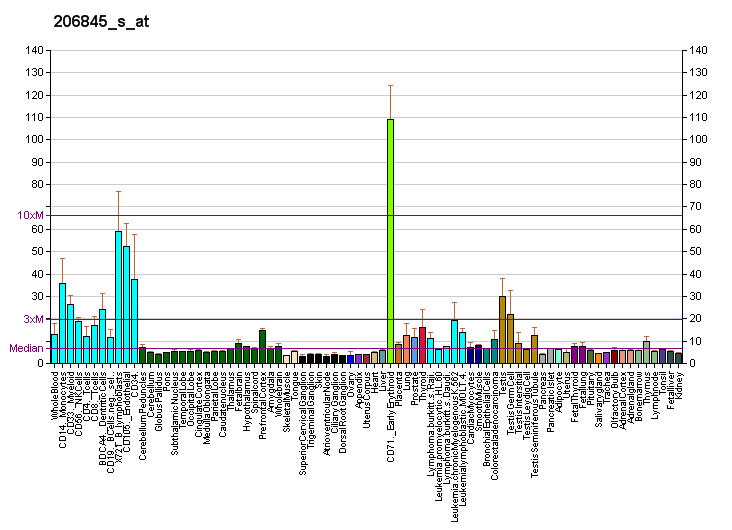
RNA expression pattern
Bgee	Human / Mouse (ortholog); Top expressed in: ventricular zone; left testis; right testis; ganglionic eminence; mucosa of transverse colon; islet of Langerhans; right lobe of thyroid gland; granulocyte; sural nerve; right hemisphere of cerebellum / Top expressed in: granulocyte; spermatid; spermatocyte; neural layer of retina; zygote; ventricular zone; lip; muscle of thigh; dentate gyrus of hippocampal formation granule cell; esophagus; More reference expression data
BioGPS	More reference expression data
Gene ontology
Molecular function	metal ion binding; protein-containing complex binding; ubiquitin conjugating enzyme binding; syntaxin-1 binding; protein homodimerization activity; mRNA 3'-UTR binding; ubiquitin protein ligase binding; protein binding; ubiquitin-protein transferase activity; transferase activity
Cellular component	axon terminus; cytosol; membrane; HULC complex; extrinsic component of membrane; ubiquitin ligase complex; nucleus; neuron projection; nucleoplasm; protein-containing complex
Biological process	negative regulation of mRNA polyadenylation; histone H2B ubiquitination; positive regulation of proteasomal protein catabolic process; response to peptide hormone; regulation of mitotic cell cycle; positive regulation of protein polyubiquitination; histone monoubiquitination; ubiquitin-dependent protein catabolic process; positive regulation of histone H2B ubiquitination; protein ubiquitination; chromatin organization
Sources:Amigo / QuickGO
Orthologs
Databases	NCBI: entry; OMA: entry
Species	Human	Mouse
Entrez	9810	233900
Ensembl	ENSG00000103549	ENSMUSG00000030816
UniProt	O75150	Q3U319
RefSeq (mRNA)	NM_001207033; NM_001207034; NM_001286572; NM_014771; NM_194352	NM_172281; NM_001360883
RefSeq (protein)	NP_001193962; NP_001193963; NP_001273501; NP_055586	NP_758485; NP_001347812
Location (UCSC)	Chr 16: 30.76 – 30.78 Mb	Chr 7: 127.19 – 127.2 Mb
PubMed search
- Wikidata
View/Edit Human	View/Edit Mouse

E3 ubiquitin-protein ligase BRE1B is an enzyme that in humans is encoded by the RNF40 gene.

== Function ==
The protein encoded by this gene contains a RING finger, a motif known to be involved in protein-protein and protein-DNA interactions. This protein was reported to interact with the tumor suppressor protein RB1. Studies of the rat counterpart suggested that this protein may function as an E3 ubiquitin-protein ligase, and facilitate the ubiquitination and degradation of syntaxin 1, which is an essential component of the neurotransmitter release machinery.

== Interactions ==
RNF40 has been shown to interact with STX1A.
