= Vesicle-associated membrane protein 7 =

Protein-coding gene in the species Homo sapiens

VAMP7
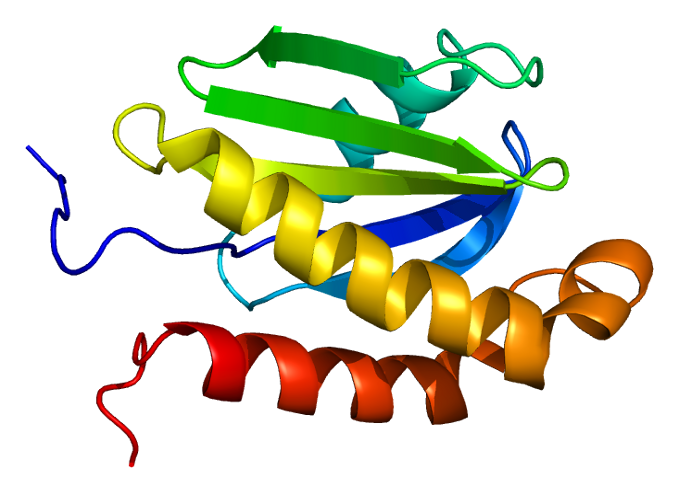

Identifiers
- Aliases: VAMP7, SYBL1, TI-VAMP, TIVAMP, VAMP-7, vesicle associated membrane protein 7
- External IDs: OMIM: 300053; MGI: 1096399; GeneCards: VAMP7
Available structures
| PDB | Ortholog search: PDBe RCSB |
| PDB | List of PDB id codes 2DMW |

Gene location (Human)
| Chr. | X chromosome (human) |
| Band | Xq28 and Yq12 | Start | 155,881,345 bp |
| Band | Xq28 and Yq12 | End | 155,943,769 bp |
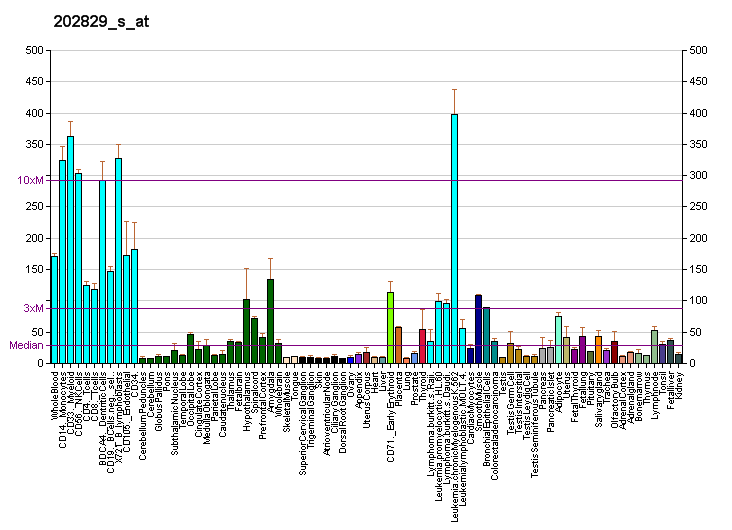
RNA expression pattern
| Bgee | Human / Mouse (ortholog); Top expressed in: secondary oocyte; monocyte; endothelial cell; visceral pleura; parietal pleura; glomerulus; trabecular bone; kidney tubule; metanephric glomerulus; tibia / n/a; More reference expression data |
| BioGPS | More reference expression data |
Gene ontology
| Molecular function | SNARE binding; SNAP receptor activity; syntaxin binding; protein binding |
| Cellular component | extracellular exosome; transport vesicle; pseudopodium; cytoplasm; transport vesicle membrane; synapse; integral component of membrane; trans-Golgi network; azurophil granule membrane; Golgi apparatus; cell junction; platelet alpha granule; intracellular membrane-bounded organelle; lamellipodium; apical part of cell; neuron projection; membrane; cell surface; phagocytic vesicle membrane; endoplasmic reticulum; perinuclear region of cytoplasm; endoplasmic reticulum membrane; secretory granule; secretory granule membrane; lysosome; cytoplasmic vesicle; late endosome membrane; endosome; phagocytic vesicle; plasma membrane; lysosomal membrane; SNARE complex; clathrin-coated vesicle membrane; synaptic vesicle; integral component of synaptic vesicle membrane; hippocampal mossy fiber to CA3 synapse |
| Biological process | autophagosome maturation; vesicle transport along microtubule; vesicle fusion with Golgi apparatus; Golgi to plasma membrane protein transport; positive regulation of histamine secretion by mast cell; SNARE complex assembly; calcium-ion regulated exocytosis; triglyceride transport; endoplasmic reticulum to Golgi vesicle-mediated transport; post-Golgi vesicle-mediated transport; regulation of protein targeting to vacuolar membrane; exocytosis; natural killer cell degranulation; phagocytosis, engulfment; protein transport; endosome to lysosome transport; positive regulation of dendrite morphogenesis; vesicle fusion; vesicle-mediated transport; neutrophil degranulation; eosinophil degranulation; endocytosis; membrane organization; transport |
Sources:Amigo / QuickGO
Orthologs
| Databases | NCBI: entry; OMA: entry |
| Species | Human | Mouse |
| Entrez | 6845 | 20955 |
| Ensembl | ENSG00000124333 | ENSMUSG00000051412 |
| UniProt | P51809 | P70280 |
| RefSeq (mRNA) | NM_001145149; NM_001185183; NM_005638 | NM_001302138; NM_011515; NM_001359151 |
| RefSeq (protein) | NP_001138621; NP_001172112; NP_005629 | NP_001289067; NP_035645; NP_001346080 |
| Location (UCSC) | Chr X: 155.88 – 155.94 Mb | n/a |
| PubMed search |
- Wikidata
| View/Edit Human | View/Edit Mouse |

Vesicle-associated membrane protein 7 (VAMP-7), is a protein that in humans is encoded by the VAMP7 gene also known as the SYBL1 gene.

== Function ==
VAMP-7 is a transmembrane protein that is a member of the soluble N-ethylmaleimide-sensitive factor attachment protein receptor (SNARE) family. VAMP-7 localizes to late endosomes and lysosomes and is involved in the fusion of transport vesicles to their target membranes.

== Interactions ==
VAMP-7 has been shown to interact with SNAP23 and AP3D1.
