= VAMP3 =

Protein-coding gene in humans

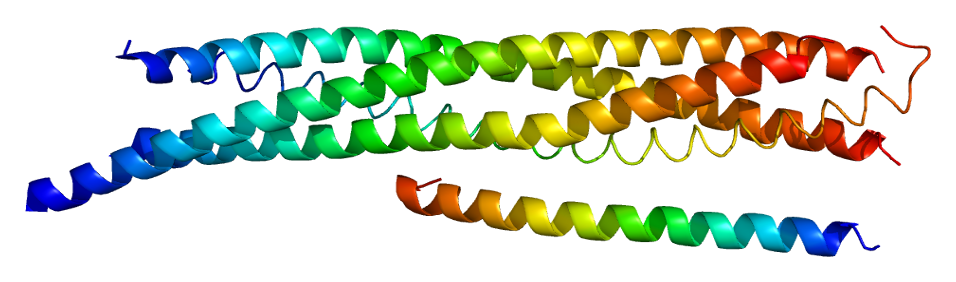

Identifiers
- Aliases: VAMP3, CEB, vesicle associated membrane protein 3
- External IDs: OMIM: 603657; MGI: 1321389; GeneCards: VAMP3

Gene location (Human)
Chr.	Chromosome 1 (human)
Band	1p36.23	Start	7,771,296 bp
Band	1p36.23	End	7,781,432 bp

Gene location (Mouse)
Chr.	Chromosome 4 (mouse)
Band	4|4 E2	Start	151,131,757 bp
Band	4|4 E2	End	151,142,420 bp
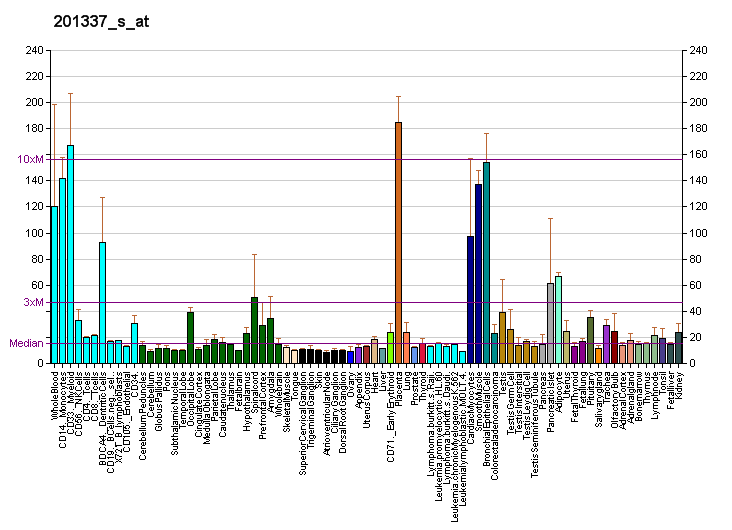

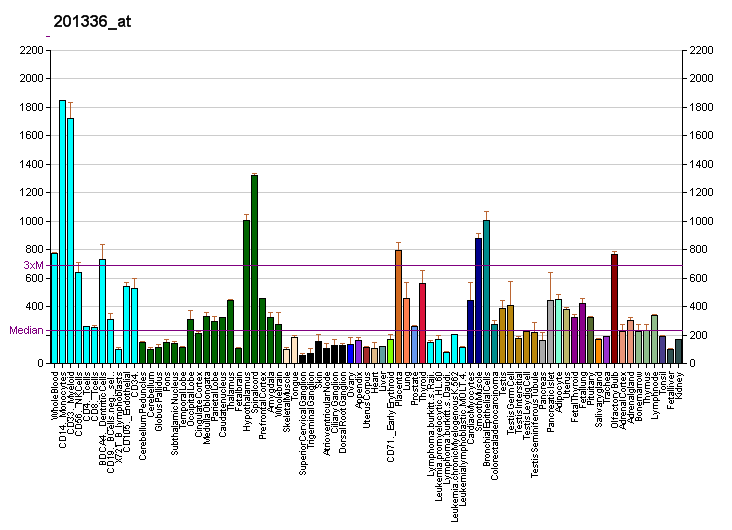

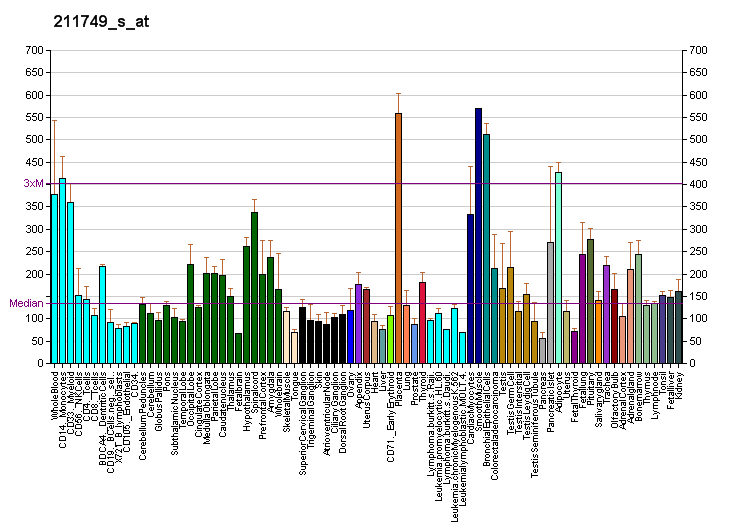
RNA expression pattern
Bgee	Human / Mouse (ortholog); Top expressed in: inferior olivary nucleus; parietal pleura; visceral pleura; optic nerve; gingival epithelium; inferior ganglion of vagus nerve; dorsal motor nucleus of vagus nerve; C1 segment; palpebral conjunctiva; trabecular bone / Top expressed in: endothelial cell of lymphatic vessel; ciliary body; primitive streak; iris; retinal pigment epithelium; conjunctival fornix; epithelium of lens; stroma of bone marrow; Paneth cell; epithelium of stomach; More reference expression data
BioGPS	More reference expression data
Gene ontology
Molecular function	SNAP receptor activity; protein binding; SNARE binding; syntaxin-1 binding
Cellular component	integral component of membrane; recycling endosome; cytosol; intracellular membrane-bounded organelle; membrane; synapse; intracellular anatomical structure; secretory granule; cell surface; cell junction; SNARE complex; apical plasma membrane; intracellular organelle; neuron projection; cytoplasmic vesicle; clathrin-coated vesicle; trans-Golgi network membrane; transport vesicle; plasma membrane; clathrin-coated vesicle membrane; phagocytic vesicle membrane; perinuclear region of cytoplasm; recycling endosome membrane; phagocytic vesicle; integral component of synaptic vesicle membrane
Biological process	Golgi to plasma membrane protein transport; mucus secretion; regulation of histamine secretion by mast cell; membrane fusion; vesicle docking involved in exocytosis; retrograde transport, endosome to Golgi; negative regulation of secretion by cell; protein transport; substrate adhesion-dependent cell spreading; vesicle fusion; vesicle-mediated transport; calcium-ion regulated exocytosis; positive regulation of receptor recycling; exocytosis; SNARE complex assembly; antigen processing and presentation of exogenous peptide antigen via MHC class I, TAP-dependent; membrane organization; cellular response to interferon-gamma; protein-containing complex assembly
Sources:Amigo / QuickGO
Orthologs
Databases	NCBI: entry; OMA: entry
Species	Human	Mouse
Entrez	9341	22319
Ensembl	ENSG00000049245	ENSMUSG00000028955
UniProt	Q15836; Q6FGG2	P63024
RefSeq (mRNA)	NM_004781	NM_009498
RefSeq (protein)	NP_004772; NP_004772.1	NP_033524
Location (UCSC)	Chr 1: 7.77 – 7.78 Mb	Chr 4: 151.13 – 151.14 Mb
PubMed search
- Wikidata
View/Edit Human	View/Edit Mouse

Vesicle-associated membrane protein 3 is a protein that in humans is encoded by the VAMP3 gene.

== Function ==
Synaptobrevins/VAMPs, syntaxins, and the 25-kD synaptosomal-associated protein are the main components of a protein complex involved in the docking and/or fusion of synaptic vesicles with the presynaptic membrane. This gene is a member of the vesicle-associated membrane protein (VAMP)/synaptobrevin family. Because of its high homology to other known VAMPs, its broad tissue distribution, and its subcellular localization, the protein encoded by this gene was shown to be the human equivalent of the rodent cellubrevin. In platelets the protein resides on a compartment that is not mobilized to the plasma membrane on calcium or thrombin stimulation.

== Interactions ==
VAMP3 has been shown to interact with

- BCAP31,
- BVES,
- SNAP23,
- STX4,
- STX6.
