= Popeye protein conserved region =

Family of evolutionarily related proteins

Identifiers
- Symbol: Popeye
- Pfam: PF04831
- InterPro: IPR006916
Available protein structures:
- PDB: IPR006916 PF04831 (ECOD; PDBsum)
- AlphaFold: IPR006916; PF04831

Popeye protein conserved region is common to a family of evolutionarily related proteins, the Popeye domain containing (POPDC) family of proteins, which is found in many animal phyla (vertebrates, lower chordates, arthropodes, mollusca and some protostomia).

In vertebrates it is preferentially expressed in developing and adult striated muscle (heart and skeletal muscle). It is represented by a conserved region, the Popeye domain, which functions as a cAMP-binding domain. All POPDC proteins also have three potential transmembrane domains. The strong conservation of POPDC genes during evolution and their preferential expression in heart and skeletal muscle suggest that these proteins may have an important function in these tissues in vertebrates.
