= VAMP4 =

Protein-coding gene in humans

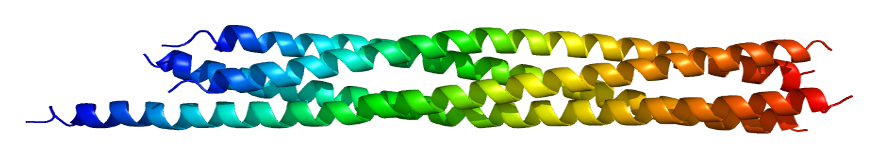

Identifiers
- Aliases: VAMP4, VAMP-4, VAMP24, vesicle associated membrane protein 4
- External IDs: OMIM: 606909; MGI: 1858730; GeneCards: VAMP4

Gene location (Human)
Chr.	Chromosome 1 (human)
Band	1q24.3	Start	171,700,160 bp
Band	1q24.3	End	171,742,074 bp

Gene location (Mouse)
Chr.	Chromosome 1 (mouse)
Band	1 H2.1|1 70.29 cM	Start	162,398,084 bp
Band	1 H2.1|1 70.29 cM	End	162,426,653 bp
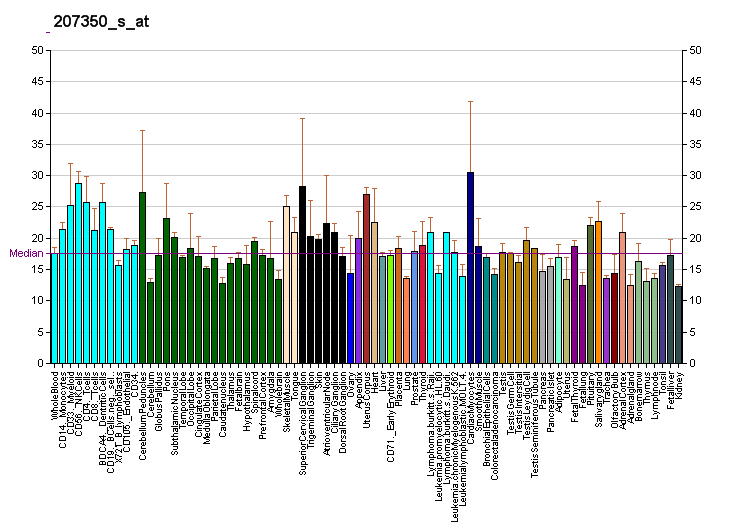

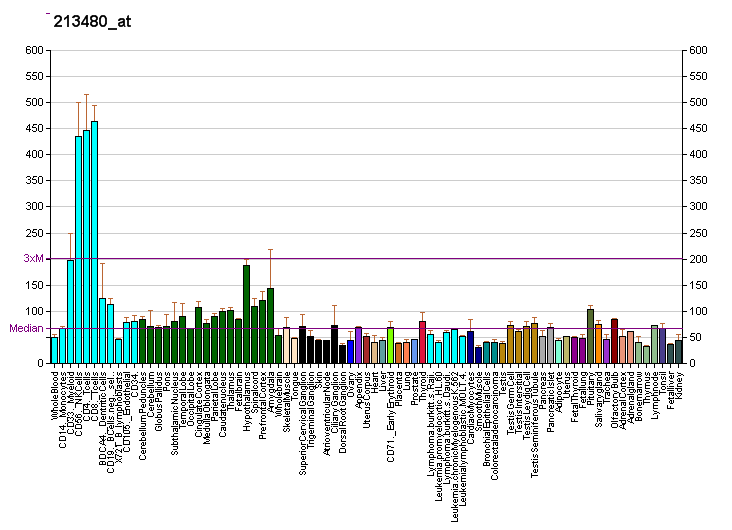
RNA expression pattern
Bgee	Human / Mouse (ortholog); Top expressed in: endothelial cell; Brodmann area 23; middle temporal gyrus; dorsal motor nucleus of vagus nerve; inferior olivary nucleus; pons; pars compacta; lateral nuclear group of thalamus; cerebellar vermis; tibia / Top expressed in: gastrula; supraoptic nucleus; pituitary gland; motor neuron; decidua; Epithelium of choroid plexus; dorsomedial hypothalamic nucleus; lateral septal nucleus; islet of Langerhans; paraventricular nucleus of hypothalamus; More reference expression data
BioGPS	More reference expression data
Gene ontology
Molecular function	SNAP receptor activity; protein binding; SNARE binding
Cellular component	integral component of membrane; cell surface; Golgi membrane; endosome; Golgi apparatus; lysosome; membrane; trans-Golgi network membrane; SNARE complex; transport vesicle; plasma membrane; clathrin-coated vesicle membrane; integral component of synaptic vesicle membrane; synaptic vesicle
Biological process	endoplasmic reticulum to Golgi vesicle-mediated transport; Golgi ribbon formation; microtubule cytoskeleton organization; vesicle-mediated transport; SNARE complex assembly; Golgi to plasma membrane protein transport; exocytosis; membrane organization; synaptic vesicle to endosome fusion; regulation of synaptic vesicle endocytosis
Sources:Amigo / QuickGO
Orthologs
Databases	NCBI: entry; OMA: entry
Species	Human	Mouse
Entrez	8674	53330
Ensembl	ENSG00000117533	ENSMUSG00000026696
UniProt	O75379	O70480
RefSeq (mRNA)	NM_001185127; NM_003762; NM_201994	NM_016796; NM_001347125; NM_001356526; NM_001356527
RefSeq (protein)	NP_001172056; NP_003753	NP_001334054; NP_058076; NP_001343455; NP_001343456
Location (UCSC)	Chr 1: 171.7 – 171.74 Mb	Chr 1: 162.4 – 162.43 Mb
PubMed search
- Wikidata
View/Edit Human	View/Edit Mouse

Vesicle-associated membrane protein 4 is a protein that in humans is encoded by the VAMP4 gene.

== Function ==
Synaptobrevins/VAMPs, syntaxins, and the 25-kD synaptosomal-associated protein SNAP25 are the main components of a protein complex involved in the docking and/or fusion of synaptic vesicles with the presynaptic membrane. The protein encoded by this gene is a member of the vesicle-associated membrane protein (VAMP)/synaptobrevin family. This protein may play a role in trans-Golgi network-to-endosome transport.

== Interactions ==
VAMP4 has been shown to interact with AP1M1, STX6 and STX16.
