= Syntaxin =

Group of proteins

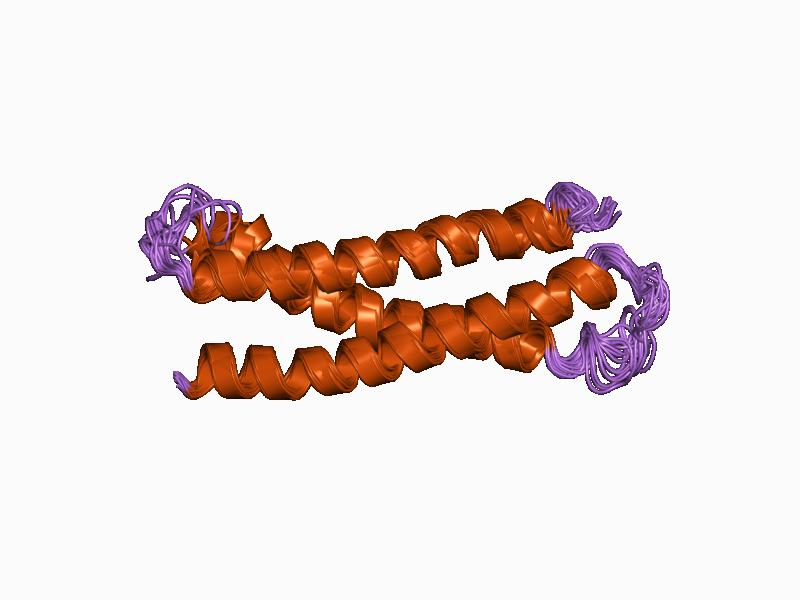
- Structure of an evolutionarily conserved N-terminal domain of syntaxin 1A.

Identifiers
- Symbol: Syntaxin
- Pfam: PF00804
- InterPro: IPR006011
- SMART: SM00503
- SCOP2: 1br0 / SCOPe / SUPFAM
- OPM superfamily: 197
- OPM protein: 2xhe
- Membranome: 349
Available protein structures:
- PDB: IPR006011 PF00804 (ECOD; PDBsum)
- AlphaFold: IPR006011; PF00804

Syntaxins are a family of membrane integrated Q-SNARE proteins participating in exocytosis.

== Domains ==
Syntaxins possess a single C-terminal transmembrane domain, a SNARE domain (known as H3), and an N-terminal regulatory domain (Habc). Syntaxin 17 may have two transmembrane domains.

- The SNARE (H3) domain binds to both synaptobrevin and SNAP-25 forming the core SNARE complex. Formation of this stable SNARE core complex is believed to generate the free energy required to initiate fusion between the vesicle membrane and plasma membrane.
- The N-terminal Habc domain is formed by 3 α-helices and when collapsed onto its own H3 helix forms an inactive "closed" syntaxin conformation. This closed conformation of syntaxin is believed to be stabilized by binding of Munc-18 (nSec1), although more recent data suggests that nSec1 may bind to other conformations of syntaxin, as well. The "open" syntaxin conformation is the conformation that is competent to form into SNARE core complexes.

== Function ==
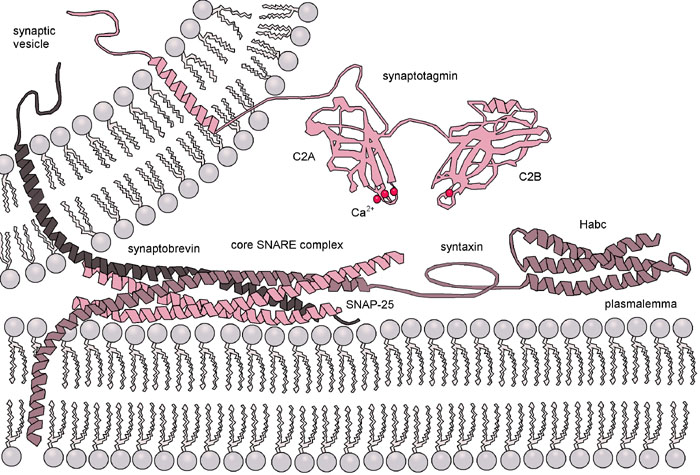
Molecular machinery driving exocytosis in neuromediator release. The core SNARE complex is formed by four α-helices contributed by synaptobrevin, syntaxin and SNAP-25, synaptotagmin serves as a Ca^{2+} sensor and regulates intimately the SNARE zipping.

In vitro syntaxin per se is sufficient to drive spontaneous calcium independent fusion of synaptic vesicles containing v-SNAREs.

More recent and somewhat controversial amperometric data suggest that the transmembrane domain of Syntaxin1A may form part of the fusion pore of exocytosis.

== Binding ==
Syntaxins bind synaptotagmin in a calcium-dependent fashion and interact with voltage dependent calcium and potassium channels via the C-terminal H3 domain. Direct syntaxin-channel interaction is a suitable molecular mechanism for proximity between the fusion machinery and the gates of Ca^{2+} entry during depolarization of the presynaptic axonal boutons.

The Sec1/Munc18 protein family is known to bind to Syntaxin and regulate Syntaxins machinery. Munc18-1 binds to Syntaxin 1A via two distinct sites referred as N-terminus binding and "closed" conformation that incorporates both the central Habc domain and the SNARE core domain. Munc18-1 binding to the N-terminus of Syntaxin-1 is thought to facilitate Syntaxin-1 interaction with another SNARE, while binding to the "closed" conformation of Syntaxin-1 is believed to be inhibitory.

Recently published data show that alternative spliced Syntaxin 1 (STX1B) which lacks the transmembrane domain localizes in the nuclei.

== Genes ==
Human genes encoding syntaxin proteins include:

- STX1A, STX1B, STX2, STX3, STX4, STX5, STX6, STX7, STX8,
- STX10, STX11, STX12, STX16, STX17, STX18, STX19

== See also ==
- Tomosyn, a syntaxin binding protein
