= Munc-18 =

Munc-18 (an acronym for mammalian uncoordinated-18) proteins are the mammalian homologue of UNC-18 (which was first discovered in the nematode worm C. elegans) and are a member of the Sec1/Munc18-like (SM) protein family. Munc-18 proteins have been identified as essential components of the synaptic vesicle fusion protein complex and are crucial for the regulated exocytosis of neurons and neuroendocrine cells.

== Function ==
Munc-18 binds syntaxin and forms a syntaxin/munc-18 complex which is thought to precede and/or regulate vesicle priming, a process mediated by VAMP, SNAP-25 and syntaxin. Munc18-1, a member of the SM family, has multiple roles in exocytosis. It directly promotes syntaxin stability and either controls the spatially correct assembly of core complexes for SNARE-dependent fusion, or acts as a direct component of the fusion machinery through the interaction with SNARE core. Munc18a, which binds specifically to the N-terminal of syntaxin, causes a conformation change, activating syntaxin, which in turn connects to the ternary-SNARE complex. Deletion of munc18-1 leads to a defect in secretory vesicle docking. Furthermore, the munc18-1 deficient mouse is the first mouse model wherein neurotransmitter secretion is completely absent. This mouse model is appropriately titled the "silent mouse."

=== Mechanism ===
This outline below presents a broad modeling of how Munc-18 is thought to play a role in vesicle docking and fusion, allowing for intentional exocytosis. As it is a combined preliminary modeling, more research is necessary to fully understand the role of Munc-18 in this process.

1. Munc18-1 binds to a closed form of syntaxin-1, blocking SNARE complex formation. This is thought to affect vesicle docking
2. Munc13 opens syntaxin-1, Munc18-1 is translocated to the SNARE complex, which releases the inhibitory effect, allowing assembly (specifically of the alpha helix 4 part bundle)
3. It is thought that Munc18-1 stabilizes the formed trans-SNARE complex, preventing its dissociation
4. The SNARE complex, potentially with the assistance of Munc-18 brings the membranes together and causes fusion

It has also been shown in one study that Munc-18 binds to the C-terminus of synaptobrevin, suggesting that this protein plays an important role in membrane fusion.

== Family members ==
The following is a list of human munc-18 proteins:

protein	gene	
protein	symbol	name
MUNC18-1	STXBP1	syntaxin binding protein 1
MUNC18-2	STXBP2	syntaxin binding protein 2
MUNC18-3	STXBP3	syntaxin binding protein 3
MUNC18-4	STXBP4	syntaxin binding protein 4
MUNC18-5	STXBP5	syntaxin binding protein 5
MUNC18-6	STXBP6	syntaxin binding protein 6

== See also ==
- Vesicle fusion
- Exocytosis
- Syntaxin
- SNARE
