= Zero ionic layer =

Interaction site in SNARE complex

Zero ionic layer is the main site of interaction in the core SNARE complex. Dipole-dipole interactions take place between 3 glutamine (Q) residues and 1 arginine (R) residue exposed in this layer. Despite that, the majority of the SNARE complex is hydrophobic because of the leucine zipper. Extensively studied layers within the SNARE alpha-helical bundle are designated from "-7" to "+8". Zero ionic layer is at the center of the bundle, and thus designated as "0" layer.

== Structure ==
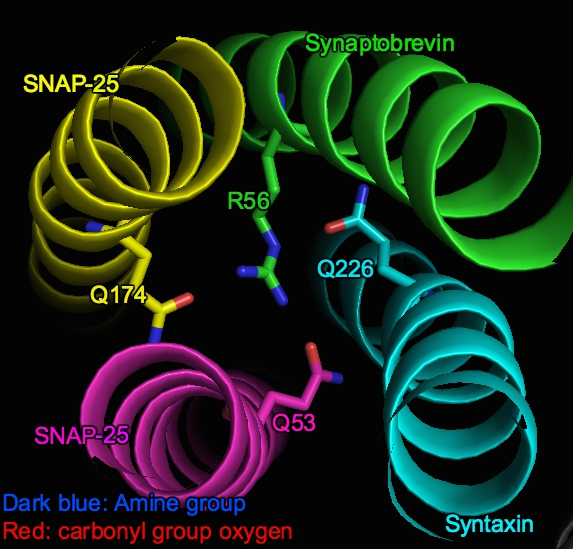
SNARE complex zoomed in to the zero ionic layer level on Pymol simulator

SNARE complex is a bundle formed by 4 alpha-helical proteins, including vesicle-associated synaptobrevin and cell-membrane-associated syntaxin and SNAP. When the bundle is viewed on the side, for every alpha-helical turn, the alpha-carbons from each helix form a plane, which is thus designated as a "layer". Along the helical bundle from N-terminus to C-terminus, layers are designated from "-7" to "+8" respectively. "0" layer (i.e. zero ionic layer) is at the center of the helical bundle.

The zero ionic layer is an ionic domain within the otherwise largely hydrophobic alpha-helical complex (SNARE complex) . It is stabilized by attractive forces(dipole-dipole interactions) between three partially negatively charged carbonyl groups of glutamine residues and a positively charged arginine. Specifically, these interacting groups include Q226 on Syntaxin, Q53 on SNAP-25 (Sn1), Q174 on SNAP-25 (Sn2) and R56 on Synaptobrevin (v-SNARE).

The 4 amino acids are asymmetrically arranged in the layer, as shown in the picture. However, their intensive interactions ensure the layer's stability: the arginine side chain end lies in the center of the asymmetry and amino groups form hydrogen bonds with the three glutamine residues. Thus, steric and electrostatic fit is well established.

== Function and research interest ==
SNARE proteins are a family of a proteins that are located in cell membranes to mediate any secretory pathways. The complex is formed during exocytosis, a process where the vesicles inside the cell fuse with the cell membrane to secrete molecules into the extracellular space.

The zero ionic layer of the SNARE complex is at special interest to scientists studying SNARE because of its three characteristics. Firstly, it is the only hydrophilic region in the entire hydrophobic SNARE complex; secondly, unlike most of the other layers, it displays asymmetry; thirdly, the 3Q:1R arrangement is found in almost all of the SNARE superfamily among eukaryotic cells. These unique aspects imply its importance to eukaryotic organisms in general. However, the exact and functions of zero ionic layer is still under investigation.

Previous studies have focused on how mutations in this layer would affect the functionality of SNARE complex in secretory pathways. Even though the exact mechanism still awaits further investigation, these studies have revealed that the integrity of zero ionic layer is not essential to the proper alignment during complex formation, but it is essential to the disassociation of SNARE complex and the recycling of its 4 constituent alpha-helical proteins after exocytosis.

An ATPase (NSF) together with a cofactor (α-SNAP) facilitates the breakdown of the SNARE complex after the completion of exocytosis. Studies have suggested that, during the disassociation process, the NSF/α-SNAP complex acts specifically on the zero ionic layer, particularly, the glutamine residue (Q226) in Syntaxin. The glutamine residue transmits the conformational change of NSF/α-SNAP complex to the SNARE complex in order to disrupt and thus disassociate the SNARE complex at the zero ionic layer. More specifically, even though the ionic layer is buried within the hydrophobic complex for the most part, during disassociation, NSF/α-SNAP complex may disturb the hydrophobic shielding and thus let water molecules into the core. This exposure of other hydrophilic molecules disturb the original hydrogen bonding equilibrium and thus facilitate disassembly of the alpha-helical bundle.

== Mutation and alternation ==
In studies that use exocytotic SNAREs of yeast as models, a mutation from glutamine to arginine in the zero ionic layer leads to yeast cells that have deficient growth and protein secretion ability. However, a mutation from arginine to glutamine in this layer leads to yeast cells that are functionally wild-type. In the mutation where all four amino acids in the zero ionic layer are glutamine residues, the cells still exhibit normal secretory ability, but defects may become pronounced when there are other mutations.

Complementary mutations, where a glutamine to arginine mutation is paired with an arginine to glutamine mutation in the zero ionic layer, have resulted in functionally wild-type yeast cells too, according to their secretory ability.

These mutation studies have been done to study the role of the four amino acids in zero ionic layer. Underlying mechanisms of why these mutations would lead to certain results are not well discussed. In general, the glutamine residues in this layer are of critical importance to the functionality of mutated strains. As long as the glutamine is intact or compensated in someway during mutation, functionality of SNARE complex will be retained.
