= CPLX1 =

Protein-coding gene in humans

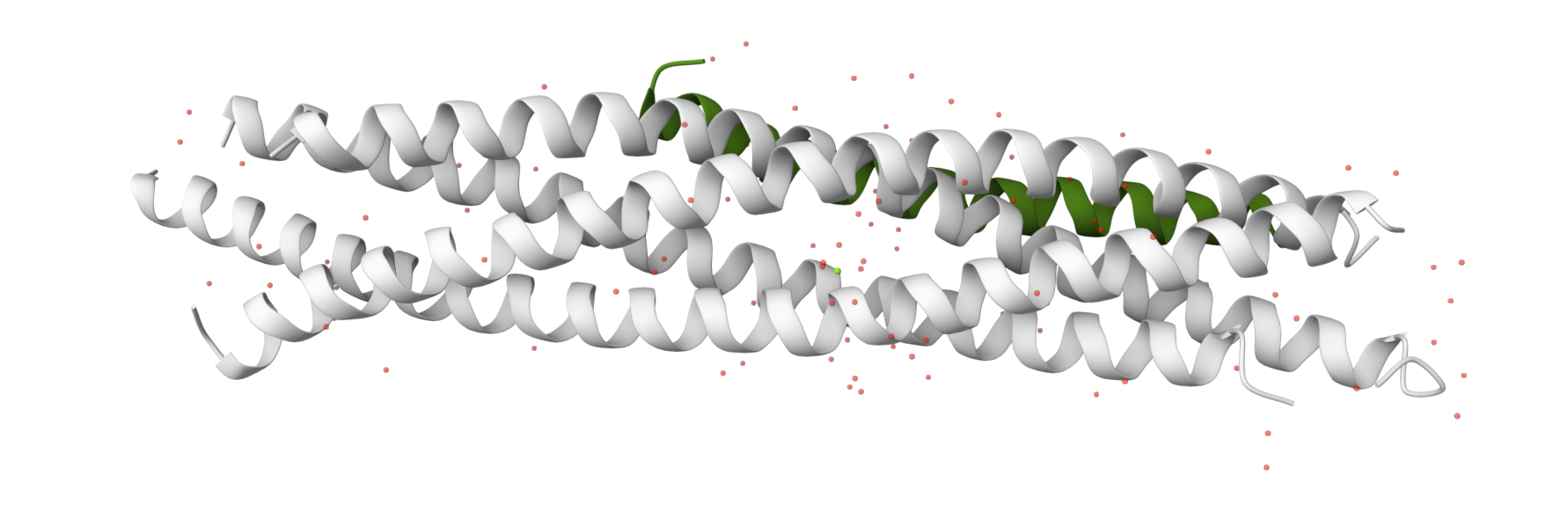

Identifiers
- Aliases: CPLX1, CPX-I, CPX1, complexin 1, EIEE63, DEE63
- External IDs: OMIM: 605032; MGI: 104727; GeneCards: CPLX1
Available structures
PDB	Ortholog search: PDBe RCSB
PDB	List of PDB id codes 3RK3, 3RL0

Gene location (Human)
Chr.	Chromosome 4 (human)
Band	4p16.3	Start	784,957 bp
Band	4p16.3	End	826,129 bp

Gene location (Mouse)
Chr.	Chromosome 5 (mouse)
Band	5|5 F	Start	108,666,420 bp
Band	5|5 F	End	108,697,890 bp
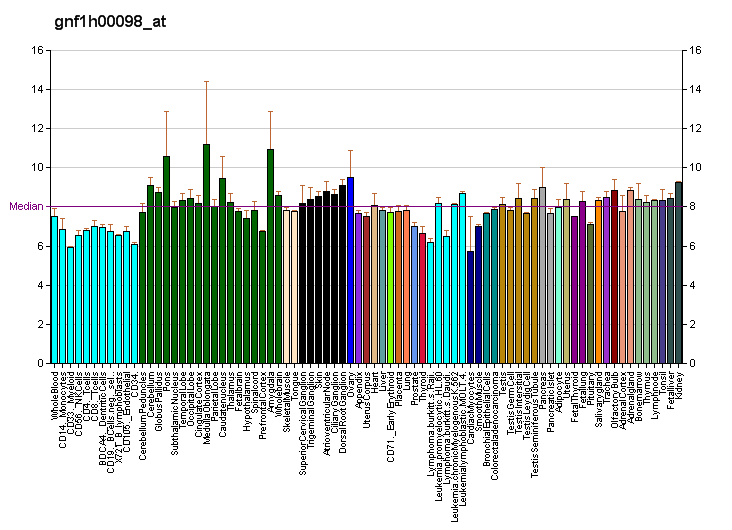
RNA expression pattern
Bgee	Human / Mouse (ortholog); Top expressed in: lateral nuclear group of thalamus; external globus pallidus; postcentral gyrus; pons; superior frontal gyrus; right frontal lobe; putamen; primary visual cortex; right hemisphere of cerebellum; caudate nucleus / Top expressed in: motor neuron; substantia nigra; facial motor nucleus; pontine nuclei; lateral geniculate nucleus; medial vestibular nucleus; habenula; anterior horn of spinal cord; medial geniculate nucleus; deep cerebellar nuclei; More reference expression data
BioGPS	More reference expression data
Gene ontology
Molecular function	syntaxin-1 binding; neurotransmitter transmembrane transporter activity; syntaxin binding; SNARE binding; protein binding
Cellular component	cytoplasm; cytosol; synapse; synaptobrevin 2-SNAP-25-syntaxin-3-complexin complex; synaptobrevin 2-SNAP-25-syntaxin-1a-complexin I complex; soma; dendrite; SNARE complex; protein-containing complex; presynapse; calyx of Held; Schaffer collateral - CA1 synapse; postsynapse; glutamatergic synapse; terminal bouton
Biological process	synaptic vesicle exocytosis; insulin secretion; regulation of exocytosis; neurotransmitter transport; exocytosis; chemical synaptic transmission; regulation of synaptic vesicle fusion to presynaptic active zone membrane; exocytic insertion of neurotransmitter receptor to postsynaptic membrane; vesicle-mediated transport in synapse; regulation of neurotransmitter secretion; neurotransmitter secretion; glutamate secretion
Sources:Amigo / QuickGO
Orthologs
Databases	NCBI: entry; OMA: entry
Species	Human	Mouse
Entrez	10815	12889
Ensembl	ENSG00000168993	ENSMUSG00000033615
UniProt	O14810	P63040
RefSeq (mRNA)	NM_006651	NM_007756
RefSeq (protein)	NP_006642	NP_031782
Location (UCSC)	Chr 4: 0.78 – 0.83 Mb	Chr 5: 108.67 – 108.7 Mb
PubMed search
- Wikidata
View/Edit Human	View/Edit Mouse

Complexin-1 is a protein that in humans is encoded by the CPLX1 gene.

== Function ==
Proteins encoded by the complexin/synaphin gene family are cytosolic proteins that function in synaptic vesicle exocytosis. These proteins bind syntaxin, part of the SNAP receptor. The protein product of this gene binds to the SNAP receptor complex and disrupts it, allowing transmitter release.

== Interactions ==
CPLX1 has been shown to interact with SNAP-25 and STX1A.
