= STX2 =

Protein-coding gene in the species Homo sapiens

Identifiers
- Aliases: STX2, EPIM, EPM, STX2A, STX2B, STX2C, syntaxin 2
- External IDs: OMIM: 132350; MGI: 108059; GeneCards: STX2

Gene location (Human)
Chr.	Chromosome 12 (human)
Band	12q24.33	Start	130,789,600 bp
Band	12q24.33	End	130,839,266 bp

Gene location (Mouse)
Chr.	Chromosome 5 (mouse)
Band	5 G1.3|5 67.99 cM	Start	129,061,621 bp
Band	5 G1.3|5 67.99 cM	End	129,085,638 bp
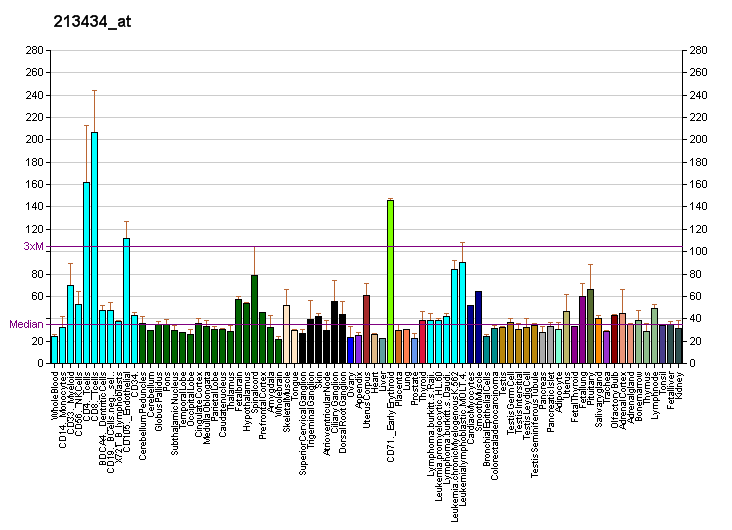
RNA expression pattern
Bgee	Human / Mouse (ortholog); Top expressed in: secondary oocyte; sural nerve; right lung; stromal cell of endometrium; ganglionic eminence; C1 segment; gastric mucosa; right uterine tube; bronchial epithelial cell; ventricular zone / Top expressed in: spermatid; lumbar spinal ganglion; fetal liver hematopoietic progenitor cell; granulocyte; endothelial cell of lymphatic vessel; olfactory epithelium; tibiofemoral joint; trigeminal ganglion; internal carotid artery; external carotid artery; More reference expression data
BioGPS	More reference expression data
Gene ontology
Molecular function	protein dimerization activity; SNAP receptor activity; calcium-dependent protein binding; protein binding; SNARE binding
Cellular component	integral component of membrane; intracellular membrane-bounded organelle; membrane; synaptic vesicle; plasma membrane; basolateral plasma membrane; SNARE complex; lamellipodium; extracellular space; endomembrane system; presynaptic membrane; presynaptic active zone membrane
Biological process	cell differentiation; ectoderm development; synaptic vesicle fusion to presynaptic active zone membrane; response to hydroperoxide; acrosome reaction; vesicle docking; cornified envelope assembly; protein complex oligomerization; animal organ morphogenesis; intracellular protein transport; vesicle-mediated transport; signal transduction; exocytosis; vesicle fusion
Sources:Amigo / QuickGO
Orthologs
Databases	NCBI: entry; OMA: entry
Species	Human	Mouse
Entrez	2054	13852
Ensembl	ENSG00000111450	ENSMUSG00000029428
UniProt	P32856	Q00262
RefSeq (mRNA)	NM_001980; NM_194356; NM_001351049; NM_001351050; NM_001351051 NM_001351052	NM_001286033; NM_001286034; NM_007941; NM_001359022
RefSeq (protein)	NP_001971; NP_919337; NP_001337978; NP_001337979; NP_001337980 NP_001337981	n/a
Location (UCSC)	Chr 12: 130.79 – 130.84 Mb	Chr 5: 129.06 – 129.09 Mb
PubMed search
- Wikidata
View/Edit Human	View/Edit Mouse

Syntaxin-2, also known as epimorphin, is a protein that in humans is encoded by the STX2 gene.

The product of this gene belongs to the syntaxin/epimorphin family of proteins. The syntaxins are a large protein family implicated in the targeting and fusion of intracellular transport vesicles. The product of this gene regulates epithelial-mesenchymal interactions and epithelial cell morphogenesis and activation. Alternatively spliced transcript variants encoding different isoforms have been identified. When the N terminus is on the cytosolic face it acts as a t-SNARE involved in intracellular vesicle docking and is called Syntaxin-2. When flipped inside out, i.e. N terminus hangs out on the extracellular surface (by some nonclassical secretion pathway) it acts as a versatile morphogen and is called epimorphin. This membrane protein enjoys the double choice of another form of topological alternatives of being targeted to either apical or basolateral surface of an epithelial cell in a regulated way depending on various contexts. When expressed by mesenchymal cells it can instruct epithelial morphogenesis at epithelial mesenchymal interfaces.

== Interactions ==
STX2 has been shown to interact with SNAP-25, SNAP23, STXBP1 and Syntaxin binding protein 3.
