= STX11 =

Protein-coding gene in humans

Identifiers
- Aliases: STX11, FHL4, HLH4, HPLH4, syntaxin 11
- External IDs: OMIM: 605014; MGI: 1921982; GeneCards: STX11

Gene location (Human)
Chr.	Chromosome 6 (human)
Band	6q24.2	Start	144,150,517 bp
Band	6q24.2	End	144,191,939 bp

Gene location (Mouse)
Chr.	Chromosome 10 (mouse)
Band	10|10 A2	Start	12,813,953 bp
Band	10|10 A2	End	12,840,042 bp
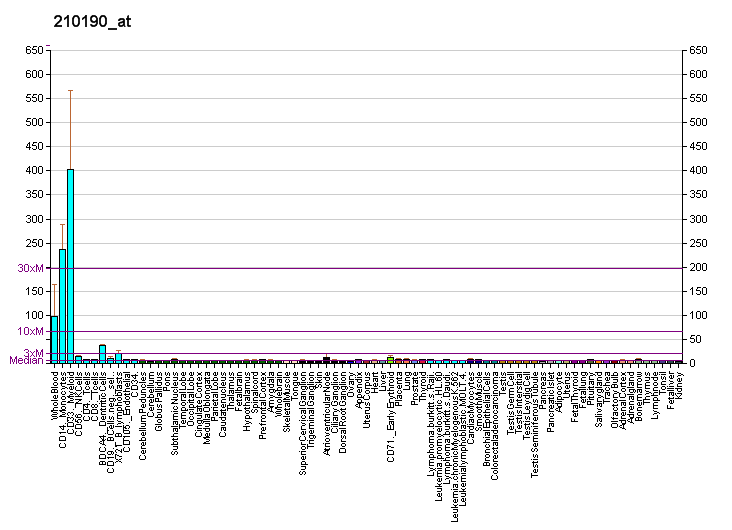
RNA expression pattern
Bgee	Human / Mouse (ortholog); Top expressed in: monocyte; granulocyte; blood; bone marrow; bone marrow cell; right lung; lower lobe of lung; upper lobe of left lung; subcutaneous adipose tissue; spleen / Top expressed in: granulocyte; blood; gastrula; transitional epithelium of urinary bladder; lumbar spinal ganglion; lens; bone marrow; decidua; spleen; right lung lobe; More reference expression data
BioGPS	More reference expression data
Gene ontology
Molecular function	protein binding; SNARE binding; SNAP receptor activity
Cellular component	integral component of membrane; plasma membrane; Golgi apparatus; SNARE complex; membrane; synaptic vesicle; endomembrane system; presynaptic membrane; presynaptic active zone membrane
Biological process	protein transport; vesicle docking; synaptic vesicle fusion to presynaptic active zone membrane; membrane fusion; vesicle-mediated transport; intracellular protein transport; exocytosis; vesicle fusion
Sources:Amigo / QuickGO
Orthologs
Databases	NCBI: entry; OMA: entry
Species	Human	Mouse
Entrez	8676	74732
Ensembl	ENSG00000135604	ENSMUSG00000039232
UniProt	O75558	Q9D3G5
RefSeq (mRNA)	NM_003764	NM_001163590; NM_001163591; NM_029075
RefSeq (protein)	NP_003755	NP_001157062; NP_001157063; NP_083351
Location (UCSC)	Chr 6: 144.15 – 144.19 Mb	Chr 10: 12.81 – 12.84 Mb
PubMed search
- Wikidata
View/Edit Human	View/Edit Mouse

Syntaxin 11, also known as STX11, is a human gene that is a member of the t-SNARE family.

== Interactions ==
STX11 has been shown to interact with SNAP25 and SNAP23.

== See also ==
- Hemophagocytic lymphohistiocytosis
- Peutz–Jeghers syndrome
