= TXLNB =

Protein-coding gene in the species Homo sapiens

Identifiers
- Aliases: TXLNB, C6orf198, LST001, MDP77, dJ522B19.2, taxilin beta
- External IDs: OMIM: 611438; MGI: 2671945; HomoloGene: 44534; GeneCards: TXLNB; OMA:TXLNB - orthologs

Gene location (Human)
Chr.	Chromosome 6 (human)
Band	6q24.1	Start	139,240,061 bp
Band	6q24.1	End	139,291,998 bp

Gene location (Mouse)
Chr.	Chromosome 10 (mouse)
Band	10|10 A2	Start	17,671,974 bp
Band	10|10 A2	End	17,721,413 bp
RNA expression pattern
Bgee	Human / Mouse (ortholog); Top expressed in: vastus lateralis muscle; Skeletal muscle tissue of rectus abdominis; muscle of thigh; biceps brachii; Skeletal muscle tissue of biceps brachii; deltoid muscle; gastrocnemius muscle; myocardium of left ventricle; cardiac muscle tissue of right atrium; body of tongue / Top expressed in: interventricular septum; myocardium of ventricle; muscle of thigh; soleus muscle; intercostal muscle; cardiac muscles; right ventricle; extraocular muscle; sternocleidomastoid muscle; triceps brachii muscle; More reference expression data
BioGPS	n/a
Orthologs
Species	Human	Mouse
Entrez	167838	378431
Ensembl	ENSG00000164440	ENSMUSG00000039891
UniProt	Q8N3L3	Q8VBT1
RefSeq (mRNA)	NM_153235	NM_138628
RefSeq (protein)	NP_694967	NP_619534
Location (UCSC)	Chr 6: 139.24 – 139.29 Mb	Chr 10: 17.67 – 17.72 Mb
PubMed search
- Wikidata
View/Edit Human	View/Edit Mouse

Beta-taxilin is a protein that in humans is encoded by the TXLNB gene.

== Interactions ==
TXLNB has been shown to interact with STX4.
