= STXBP5 =

Protein-coding gene in the species Homo sapiens

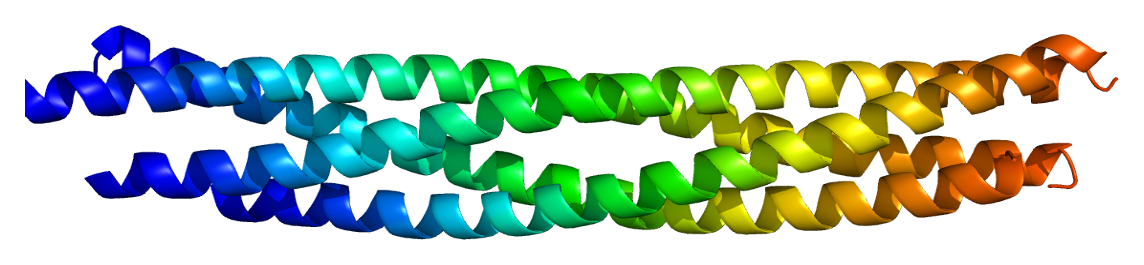

Identifiers
- Aliases: STXBP5, Tomosyn, LGL3, LLGL3, Nbla04300, syntaxin binding protein 5
- External IDs: OMIM: 604586; MGI: 1926058; GeneCards: STXBP5

Gene location (Human)
Chr.	Chromosome 6 (human)
Band	6q24.3	Start	147,204,417 bp
Band	6q24.3	End	147,390,476 bp

Gene location (Mouse)
Chr.	Chromosome 10 (mouse)
Band	10|10 A1	Start	9,755,547 bp
Band	10|10 A1	End	9,901,079 bp
RNA expression pattern
Bgee	Human / Mouse (ortholog); Top expressed in: Brodmann area 23; Achilles tendon; cerebellar hemisphere; endothelial cell; Brodmann area 9; sperm; right hemisphere of cerebellum; superior frontal gyrus; primary visual cortex; Brodmann area 46 / Top expressed in: zygote; secondary oocyte; granulocyte; mammillary body; paraventricular nucleus of hypothalamus; supraoptic nucleus; inferior colliculi; neural layer of retina; habenula; dentate gyrus; More reference expression data
BioGPS	n/a
Gene ontology
Molecular function	GTPase activator activity; syntaxin-1 binding; syntaxin binding; myosin II binding
Cellular component	integral component of membrane; acetylcholine-gated channel complex; membrane; synaptic vesicle; plasma membrane; synapse; cell junction; cytoplasmic vesicle membrane; cytoplasmic vesicle; cytosol; cytoplasm; neuromuscular junction; Schaffer collateral - CA1 synapse; extrinsic component of presynaptic membrane; presynaptic cytosol; SNARE complex
Biological process	regulation of exocytosis; protein transport; positive regulation of exocytosis; vesicle-mediated transport; exocytosis; regulation of protein secretion; positive regulation of GTPase activity; synaptic vesicle cycle
Sources:Amigo / QuickGO
Orthologs
Databases	NCBI: entry; OMA: entry
Species	Human	Mouse
Entrez	134957	78808
Ensembl	ENSG00000164506	ENSMUSG00000019790
UniProt	Q5T5C0	Q8K400
RefSeq (mRNA)	NM_001127715; NM_139244; NM_001394409	NM_001081344; NM_030191
RefSeq (protein)	NP_001121187; NP_640337	NP_001074813; NP_001394992; NP_001394993; NP_001394994
Location (UCSC)	Chr 6: 147.2 – 147.39 Mb	Chr 10: 9.76 – 9.9 Mb
PubMed search
- Wikidata
View/Edit Human	View/Edit Mouse

Syntaxin-binding protein 5 is a protein that in humans is encoded by the STXBP5 gene. It is also known as tomosyn, after 友, "friend" in Japanese, for its role as a binding protein.

== Function ==
Syntaxin 1 is a component of the 7S and 20S SNARE complexes which are involved in docking and fusion of synaptic vesicles with the presynaptic plasma membrane. This gene encodes a syntaxin 1 binding protein. In rat, a similar protein dissociates syntaxin 1 from the Munc18/n-Sec1/rbSec1 complex to form a 10S complex, an intermediate which can be converted to the 7S SNARE complex. Thus this protein is thought to be involved in neurotransmitter release by stimulating SNARE complex formation. Alternatively spliced variants have been identified, but their biological validity has not been determined.

Positional cloning suggested that tomosyn might inhibit neurotransmitter secretion in Caenorhabditis elegans neurons.] This hypothesis was tested and confirmed, showing that tomosyn specifically inhibits synaptic vesicle priming—the biochemical step immediately preceding vesicle fusion and neurotransmitter release.

== Structure ==
Two functional domains were originally identified, including one which binds to syntaxin, but recent crystallization of the yeast homolog Sro7 revealed that tomosyn likely has three functional domains: one WD40 domain and one syntaxin-binding domain, as previously recognized, but also another WD40 domain. The study also suggested that tomosyn's 'syntaxin binding domain' is not the reason tomosyn is inhibitory for neurotransmitter release, as originally proposed. The Sro7-based structure is currently given on SWISS-MODEL, which includes the WD40 domains but not most of the coiled coil syntaxin-binding domain seen in the infobox.

== Interactions ==
STXBP5 has been shown to interact with STX4 and STX1A.
