= VTI1B =

Protein-coding gene in the species Homo sapiens

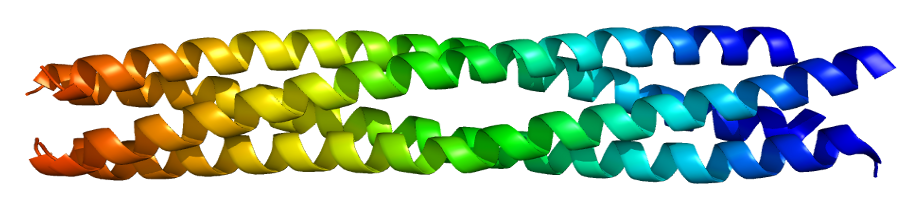

Identifiers
- Aliases: VTI1B, VTI1, VTI1-LIKE, VTI1L, VTI2, v-SNARE, vti1-rp1, vesicle transport through interaction with t-SNAREs 1B
- External IDs: OMIM: 603207; MGI: 1855688; GeneCards: VTI1B
Available structures
PDB	Ortholog search: PDBe RCSB
PDB	List of PDB id codes 2V8S

Gene location (Human)
Chr.	Chromosome 14 (human)
Band	14q24.1	Start	67,647,085 bp
Band	14q24.1	End	67,674,820 bp

Gene location (Mouse)
Chr.	Chromosome 12 (mouse)
Band	12|12 C3	Start	79,202,791 bp
Band	12|12 C3	End	79,219,441 bp
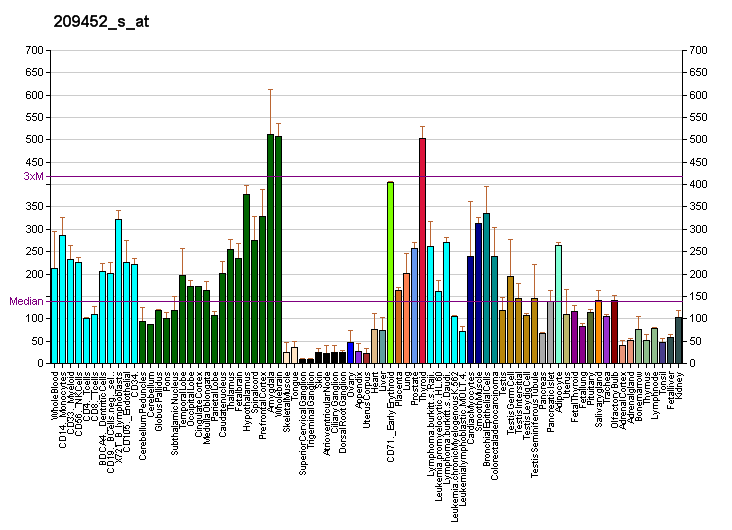
RNA expression pattern
Bgee	Human / Mouse (ortholog); Top expressed in: C1 segment; amygdala; anterior cingulate cortex; nucleus accumbens; prefrontal cortex; right frontal lobe; putamen; caudate nucleus; hypothalamus; optic nerve / Top expressed in: dorsal striatum; globus pallidus; olfactory tubercle; amygdala; nucleus accumbens; transitional epithelium of urinary bladder; cingulate gyrus; arcuate nucleus; prefrontal cortex; paraventricular nucleus of hypothalamus; More reference expression data
BioGPS	More reference expression data
Gene ontology
Molecular function	SNAP receptor activity; protein binding; chloride channel inhibitor activity; SNARE binding
Cellular component	integral component of membrane; recycling endosome; vesicle; endosome; Golgi apparatus; intracellular membrane-bounded organelle; late endosome membrane; synaptic vesicle; membrane; lysosomal membrane; soma; perinuclear region of cytoplasm; lysosome; ER to Golgi transport vesicle membrane; SNARE complex; endoplasmic reticulum membrane; extracellular region; cytosol; platelet alpha granule lumen; early endosome membrane; recycling endosome membrane
Biological process	membrane fusion; vesicle docking involved in exocytosis; autophagosome maturation; protein transport; cell population proliferation; intracellular protein transport; vesicle-mediated transport; regulation of protein localization to plasma membrane; Golgi to vacuole transport; vesicle fusion with Golgi apparatus; endoplasmic reticulum to Golgi vesicle-mediated transport; intra-Golgi vesicle-mediated transport; protein targeting to vacuole; retrograde transport, endosome to Golgi; platelet degranulation
Sources:Amigo / QuickGO
Orthologs
Databases	NCBI: entry; OMA: entry
Species	Human	Mouse
Entrez	10490	53612
Ensembl	ENSG00000100568	ENSMUSG00000021124
UniProt	Q9UEU0	O88384
RefSeq (mRNA)	NM_006370	NM_016800; NM_001364374
RefSeq (protein)	NP_006361	n/a
Location (UCSC)	Chr 14: 67.65 – 67.67 Mb	Chr 12: 79.2 – 79.22 Mb
PubMed search
- Wikidata
View/Edit Human	View/Edit Mouse

Vesicle transport through interaction with t-SNAREs homolog 1B is a protein that in humans is encoded by the VTI1B gene.

== Interactions ==
VTI1B has been shown to interact with STX8.
