= STX8 =

Protein-coding gene in the species Homo sapiens

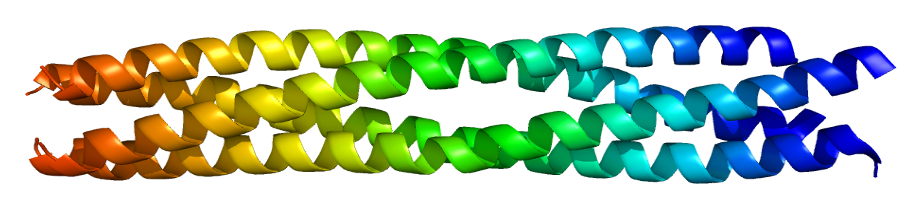

Identifiers
- Aliases: STX8, CARB, syntaxin 8
- External IDs: OMIM: 604203; MGI: 1890156; GeneCards: STX8

Gene location (Human)
Chr.	Chromosome 17 (human)
Band	17p13.1	Start	9,250,471 bp
Band	17p13.1	End	9,576,591 bp

Gene location (Mouse)
Chr.	Chromosome 11 (mouse)
Band	11|11 B3	Start	67,857,019 bp
Band	11|11 B3	End	68,097,974 bp
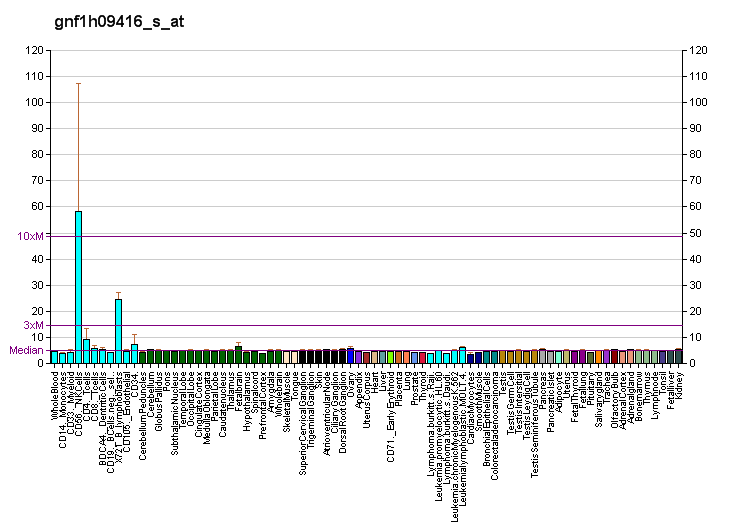

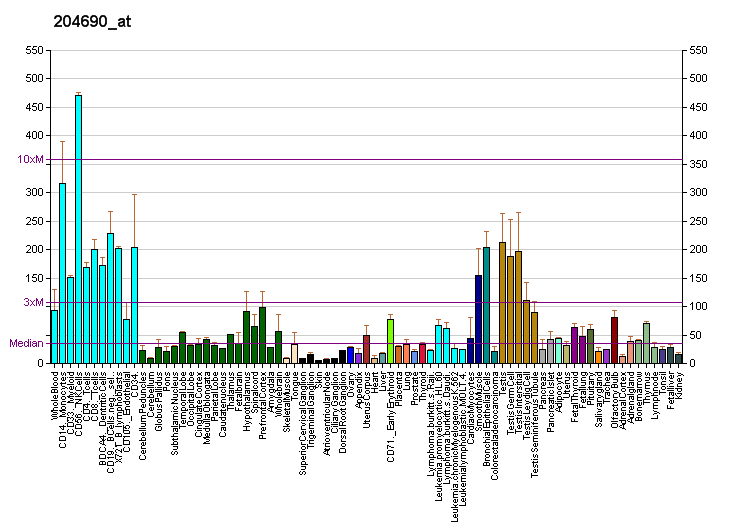

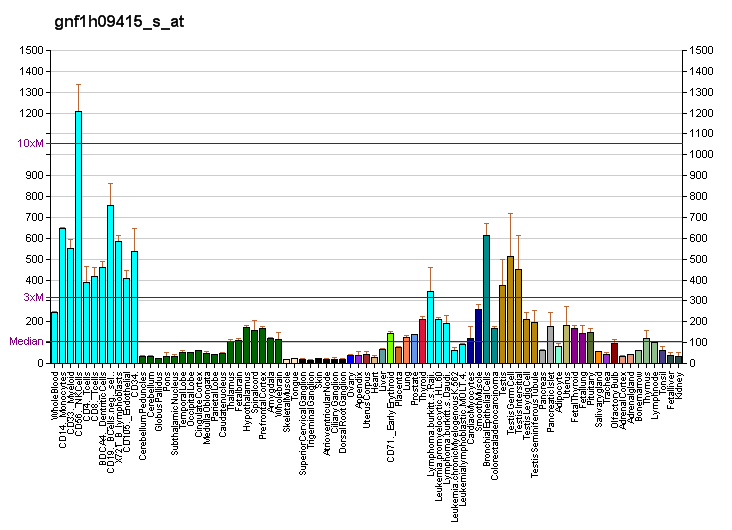
RNA expression pattern
Bgee	Human / Mouse (ortholog); Top expressed in: sperm; left testis; right testis; Achilles tendon; gastric mucosa; oocyte; islet of Langerhans; tibial arteries; muscle layer of sigmoid colon; muscle of thigh / Top expressed in: vestibular membrane of cochlear duct; spermatid; facial motor nucleus; spermatocyte; motor neuron; seminiferous tubule; epithelium of lens; right lung lobe; saccule; transitional epithelium of urinary bladder; More reference expression data
BioGPS	More reference expression data
Gene ontology
Molecular function	SNAP receptor activity; protein binding; chloride channel inhibitor activity; syntaxin binding; ubiquitin protein ligase binding; SNARE binding
Cellular component	integral component of membrane; recycling endosome; vesicle; endosome; late endosome; membrane; late endosome membrane; integral component of plasma membrane; lysosomal membrane; trans-Golgi network; early endosome; endoplasmic reticulum; perinuclear region of cytoplasm; cytosol; SNARE complex; phagocytic vesicle; endomembrane system
Biological process	endosome to lysosome transport; vesicle docking; early endosome to late endosome transport; intracellular protein transport; vesicle-mediated transport; regulation of protein localization to plasma membrane; vesicle fusion; cellular response to interferon-gamma
Sources:Amigo / QuickGO
Orthologs
Databases	NCBI: entry; OMA: entry
Species	Human	Mouse
Entrez	9482	55943
Ensembl	ENSG00000170310	ENSMUSG00000020903
UniProt	Q9UNK0	O88983
RefSeq (mRNA)	NM_004853	NM_018768; NM_001356314; NM_001361350; NM_001361351; NM_001361352
RefSeq (protein)	NP_004844	NP_061238; NP_001343243; NP_001348279; NP_001348280; NP_001348281
Location (UCSC)	Chr 17: 9.25 – 9.58 Mb	Chr 11: 67.86 – 68.1 Mb
PubMed search
- Wikidata
View/Edit Human	View/Edit Mouse

Syntaxin-8 is a protein that in humans is encoded by the STX8 gene. Syntaxin 8 directly interacts with HECTd3 and has similar subcellular localization. The protein has been shown to form the SNARE complex with syntaxin 7, vti1b and endobrevin. These function as the machinery for the homotypic fusion of late endosomes.

== Interactions ==
STX8 has been shown to interact with Vesicle-associated membrane protein 8, VTI1B and STX7.
