= Vesicle-associated membrane protein 8 =

Protein-coding gene in the species Homo sapiens

VAMP8
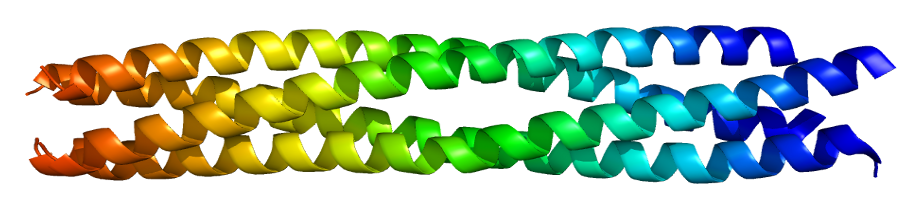

Identifiers
- Aliases: VAMP8, EDB, VAMP-8, vesicle associated membrane protein 8
- External IDs: OMIM: 603177; MGI: 1336882; GeneCards: VAMP8
Available structures
PDB	Ortholog search: PDBe RCSB
PDB	List of PDB id codes 4WY4

Gene location (Human)
Chr.	Chromosome 2 (human)
Band	2p11.2	Start	85,561,562 bp
Band	2p11.2	End	85,582,031 bp

Gene location (Mouse)
Chr.	Chromosome 6 (mouse)
Band	6 C1|6 32.27 cM	Start	72,362,206 bp
Band	6 C1|6 32.27 cM	End	72,367,686 bp
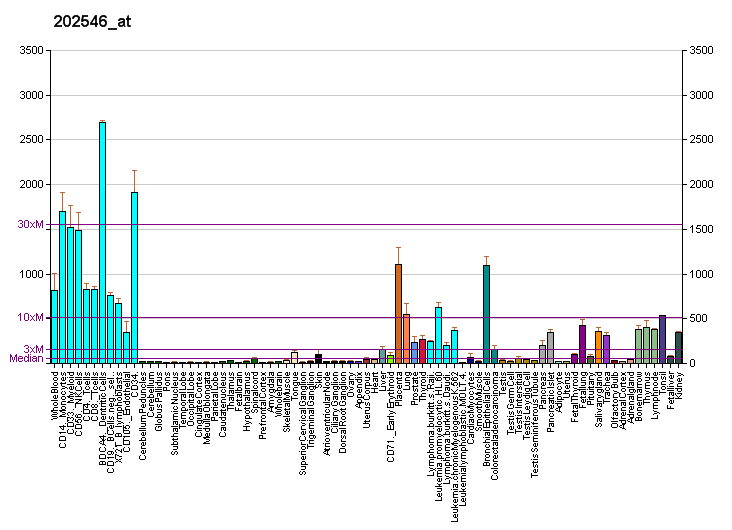
RNA expression pattern
Bgee	Human / Mouse (ortholog); Top expressed in: palpebral conjunctiva; monocyte; mucosa of transverse colon; olfactory zone of nasal mucosa; granulocyte; jejunal mucosa; rectum; nasal epithelium; bronchial epithelial cell; skin of abdomen / Top expressed in: proximal tubule; right kidney; yolk sac; granulocyte; lung; bone marrow; human kidney; urinary bladder; duodenum; lip; More reference expression data
BioGPS	More reference expression data
Gene ontology
Molecular function	SNAP receptor activity; protein binding; chloride channel inhibitor activity; SNARE binding
Cellular component	cytoplasm; integral component of membrane; recycling endosome; vesicle; cytosol; endosome; early endosome membrane; membrane; secretory granule membrane; late endosome membrane; plasma membrane; mucin granule; lysosomal membrane; SNARE complex; early endosome; perinuclear region of cytoplasm; lysosome; extracellular exosome; clathrin-coated vesicle membrane; phagocytic vesicle membrane; azurophil granule membrane; specific granule membrane; recycling endosome membrane; tertiary granule membrane; synaptic vesicle
Biological process	post-Golgi vesicle-mediated transport; autophagy; autophagosome maturation; negative regulation of secretion by cell; protein transport; viral entry into host cell; vesicle fusion; eosinophil degranulation; vesicle-mediated transport; mucus secretion; regulation of protein localization to plasma membrane; positive regulation of histamine secretion by mast cell; antigen processing and presentation of exogenous peptide antigen via MHC class I, TAP-dependent; autophagosome membrane docking; neutrophil degranulation; membrane organization; regulation of molecular function; transport
Sources:Amigo / QuickGO
Orthologs
Databases	NCBI: entry; OMA: entry
Species	Human	Mouse
Entrez	8673	22320
Ensembl	ENSG00000118640	ENSMUSG00000050732
UniProt	Q9BV40	O70404
RefSeq (mRNA)	NM_003761	NM_016794
RefSeq (protein)	NP_003752	NP_058074
Location (UCSC)	Chr 2: 85.56 – 85.58 Mb	Chr 6: 72.36 – 72.37 Mb
PubMed search
- Wikidata
View/Edit Human	View/Edit Mouse

Vesicle-associated membrane protein 8 is a protein that in humans is encoded by the VAMP8 gene.

Synaptobrevins/VAMPs, syntaxins, and the 25-kD synaptosomal-associated protein SNAP25 are the main components of a protein complex involved in the docking and/or fusion of synaptic vesicles with the presynaptic membrane. The protein encoded by this gene is a member of the vesicle-associated membrane protein (VAMP)/synaptobrevin family. It is associated with the perinuclear vesicular structures of the early endocytic compartment. It has been found that VAMP8 interacts specifically with the soluble NSF-attachment protein (alpha-SNAP), most likely through an VAMP8-containing SNARE complex. Phosphorylation of VAMP8 inside the conserved SNARE-domain can suppress vesicle fusion.

In pancreatic β-cells, VAMP8 has been shown to be part of the endosomal system. It is particularly localized to Rab11 recycling endosomes, where it plays an important role in GLP1R and GLUT2 recycling. Overexpression of VAMP8 in β-cells results in decreased insulin secretion.

== Interactions ==
Vesicle-associated membrane protein 8 has been shown to interact with STX4, SNAP23, STX1A, STX8 and STX7.
