= STX4 =

Protein-coding gene in the species Homo sapiens

Identifiers
- Aliases: STX4, STX4A, p35-2, syntaxin 4
- External IDs: OMIM: 186591; MGI: 893577; GeneCards: STX4

Gene location (Human)
Chr.	Chromosome 16 (human)
Band	16p11.2	Start	31,032,889 bp
Band	16p11.2	End	31,042,975 bp

Gene location (Mouse)
Chr.	Chromosome 7 (mouse)
Band	7|7 F3	Start	127,423,466 bp
Band	7|7 F3	End	127,448,191 bp
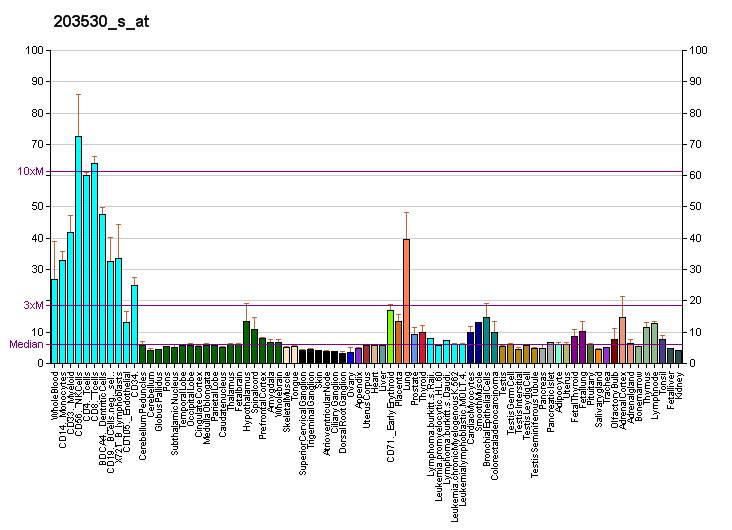
RNA expression pattern
Bgee	Human / Mouse (ortholog); Top expressed in: C1 segment; granulocyte; skin of leg; skin of abdomen; upper lobe of left lung; canal of the cervix; right lung; left uterine tube; sural nerve; left adrenal cortex / Top expressed in: Ileal epithelium; motor neuron; lip; yolk sac; muscle of thigh; granulocyte; fossa; superior frontal gyrus; neural layer of retina; condyle; More reference expression data
BioGPS	More reference expression data
Gene ontology
Molecular function	SNAP receptor activity; protein binding; sphingomyelin phosphodiesterase activator activity; SNARE binding
Cellular component	cytoplasm; integral component of membrane; cytosol; endosome; membrane; synaptic vesicle; plasma membrane; myelin sheath adaxonal region; dendritic spine; synapse; intracellular anatomical structure; cell surface; vacuole; trans-Golgi network; basolateral plasma membrane; somatodendritic compartment; specific granule; lateral loop; perinuclear region of cytoplasm; storage vacuole; extracellular exosome; lamellipodium; SNARE complex; extracellular space; phagocytic vesicle membrane; endomembrane system; presynaptic membrane; phagocytic vesicle; presynaptic active zone membrane; postsynapse; glutamatergic synapse
Biological process	positive regulation of eosinophil degranulation; positive regulation of cell migration; organelle fusion; synaptic vesicle fusion to presynaptic active zone membrane; response to hydroperoxide; positive regulation of catalytic activity; post-Golgi vesicle-mediated transport; regulation of exocytosis; vesicle docking; positive regulation of protein localization to plasma membrane; positive regulation of chemotaxis; positive regulation of cell population proliferation; positive regulation of protein localization to cell surface; regulation of extrinsic apoptotic signaling pathway via death domain receptors; positive regulation of insulin secretion involved in cellular response to glucose stimulus; intracellular protein transport; neurotransmitter transport; vesicle-mediated transport; SNARE complex assembly; positive regulation of cell adhesion; long-term potentiation; vesicle fusion with endoplasmic reticulum-Golgi intermediate compartment (ERGIC) membrane; transport; exocytosis; vesicle fusion; cytokine-mediated signaling pathway; cellular response to interferon-gamma
Sources:Amigo / QuickGO
Orthologs
Databases	NCBI: entry; OMA: entry
Species	Human	Mouse
Entrez	6810	20909
Ensembl	ENSG00000103496	ENSMUSG00000030805
UniProt	Q12846	P70452
RefSeq (mRNA)	NM_001272095; NM_001272096; NM_004604	NM_009294
RefSeq (protein)	NP_001259024; NP_001259025; NP_004595	NP_033320
Location (UCSC)	Chr 16: 31.03 – 31.04 Mb	Chr 7: 127.42 – 127.45 Mb
PubMed search
- Wikidata
View/Edit Human	View/Edit Mouse

Syntaxin-4 is a protein that in humans is encoded by the STX4 gene.

== Interactions ==
STX4 has been shown to interact with:

- Gelsolin,
- NAPA,
- RAB4A,
- SNAP-25,
- SNAP23,
- STXBP1,
- STXBP5,
- Syntaxin binding protein 3,
- TXLNB,
- VAMP2,
- VAMP3, and
- Vesicle-associated membrane protein 8.
