= STX17 =

Protein-coding gene in the species Homo sapiens

Identifiers
- Aliases: STX17, syntaxin 17
- External IDs: OMIM: 604204; MGI: 1914977; GeneCards: STX17
Available structures
PDB	Ortholog search: PDBe RCSB
PDB	List of PDB id codes 4WY4,%%s4WY4

Gene location (Human)
Chr.	Chromosome 9 (human)
Band	9q31.1	Start	99,906,654 bp
Band	9q31.1	End	99,974,534 bp

Gene location (Mouse)
Chr.	Chromosome 4 (mouse)
Band	4|4 B1	Start	48,124,915 bp
Band	4|4 B1	End	48,186,507 bp
RNA expression pattern
Bgee	Human / Mouse (ortholog); Top expressed in: nipple; secondary oocyte; Achilles tendon; pylorus; skin of hip; corpus epididymis; caput epididymis; tail of epididymis; trabecular bone; cardia / Top expressed in: parotid gland; ciliary body; saccule; zygote; interventricular septum; spermatocyte; retinal pigment epithelium; lumbar subsegment of spinal cord; seminiferous tubule; iris; More reference expression data
BioGPS	n/a
Gene ontology
Molecular function	SNAP receptor activity; protein binding; protein phosphatase binding; protein kinase binding; SNARE binding
Cellular component	HOPS complex; cytoplasm; integral component of membrane; cytosol; mitochondria associated membranes; rough endoplasmic reticulum; endoplasmic reticulum membrane; membrane; lysosomal membrane; autophagosome membrane; SNARE complex; smooth endoplasmic reticulum membrane; endoplasmic reticulum; mitochondrion; ER to Golgi transport vesicle membrane; COPII-coated ER to Golgi transport vesicle; endoplasmic reticulum-Golgi intermediate compartment membrane; cytoplasmic vesicle; endoplasmic reticulum-Golgi intermediate compartment; autophagosome; plasma membrane; endomembrane system
Biological process	endoplasmic reticulum-Golgi intermediate compartment organization; Golgi organization; protein localization to phagophore assembly site; autophagy; endoplasmic reticulum to Golgi vesicle-mediated transport; vesicle docking; autophagosome maturation; intracellular protein transport; vesicle fusion; vesicle-mediated transport; autophagosome membrane docking; exocytosis
Sources:Amigo / QuickGO
Orthologs
Databases	NCBI: entry; OMA: entry
Species	Human	Mouse
Entrez	55014	67727
Ensembl	ENSG00000136874	ENSMUSG00000061455
UniProt	P56962	Q9D0I4
RefSeq (mRNA)	NM_017919	NM_026343
RefSeq (protein)	NP_060389	NP_080619
Location (UCSC)	Chr 9: 99.91 – 99.97 Mb	Chr 4: 48.12 – 48.19 Mb
PubMed search
- Wikidata
View/Edit Human	View/Edit Mouse

Syntaxin 17 is a protein that in humans is encoded by the STX17 gene. In horses a duplication in intron 6 causes progressive graying.

== See also ==
- Syntaxin
