= SNAP25 =

Protein-coding gene in humans

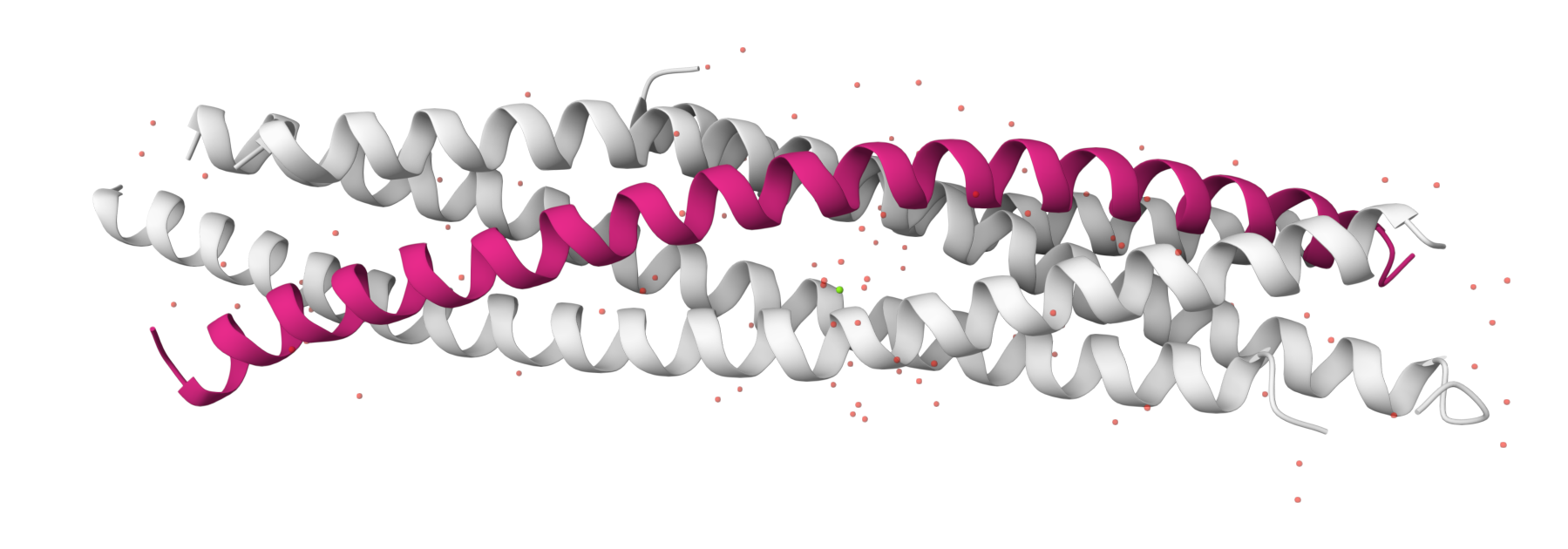

Identifiers
- Aliases: SNAP25, CMS18, RIC-4, RIC4, SEC9, SNAP, SNAP-25, bA416N4.2, dJ1068F16.2, SUP, synaptosome associated protein 25kDa, synaptosome associated protein 25
- External IDs: OMIM: 600322; MGI: 98331; GeneCards: SNAP25
Available structures
PDB	Ortholog search: PDBe RCSB
PDB	List of PDB id codes 1KIL, 1XTG, 3DDA, 3RK2, 3RK3, 3RL0, 3ZUR, 2N1T, 3DDB

Gene location (Human)
Chr.	Chromosome 20 (human)
Band	20p12.2	Start	10,172,395 bp
Band	20p12.2	End	10,308,258 bp

Gene location (Mouse)
Chr.	Chromosome 2 (mouse)
Band	2 F3|2 67.56 cM	Start	136,555,373 bp
Band	2 F3|2 67.56 cM	End	136,624,348 bp
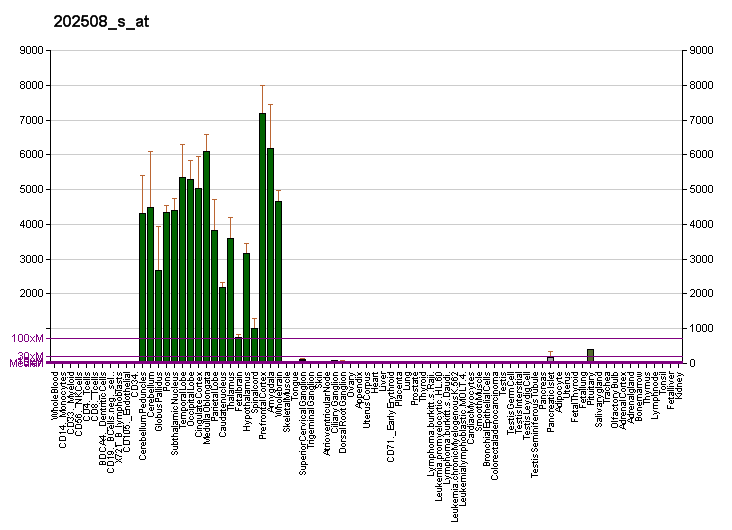

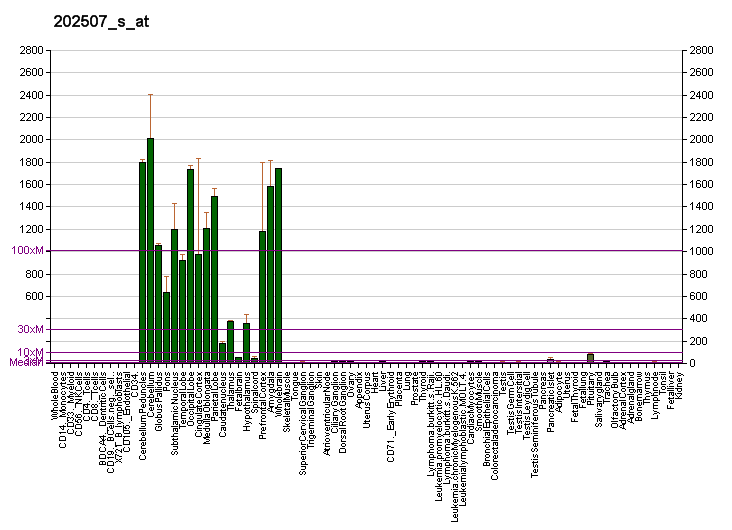
RNA expression pattern
Bgee	Human / Mouse (ortholog); Top expressed in: pons; cerebellar cortex; cerebellar hemisphere; right hemisphere of cerebellum; cerebellar vermis; superior frontal gyrus; Brodmann area 23; orbitofrontal cortex; primary visual cortex; lateral nuclear group of thalamus / Top expressed in: cerebellar vermis; lobe of cerebellum; pontine nuclei; medial dorsal nucleus; medial vestibular nucleus; subiculum; prefrontal cortex; lateral geniculate nucleus; primary motor cortex; medial geniculate nucleus; More reference expression data
BioGPS	More reference expression data
Gene ontology
Molecular function	SNAP receptor activity; calcium-dependent protein binding; protein binding; SNARE binding; syntaxin-1 binding; voltage-gated potassium channel activity; syntaxin binding
Cellular component	cytoplasm; vesicle; cytosol; membrane; growth cone; myelin sheath; BLOC-1 complex; voltage-gated potassium channel complex; plasma membrane; synapse; synaptobrevin 2-SNAP-25-syntaxin-1a-complexin I complex; cell junction; trans-Golgi network; SNARE complex; perinuclear region of cytoplasm; neuron projection; synaptic vesicle; presynaptic membrane; axon; specific granule membrane; somatodendritic compartment; tertiary granule membrane; postsynapse; extrinsic component of cytoplasmic side of plasma membrane; cytoskeleton; glutamatergic synapse
Biological process	associative learning; regulation of neuron projection development; synaptic vesicle docking; locomotory behavior; regulation of insulin secretion; synaptic vesicle exocytosis; synaptic vesicle fusion to presynaptic active zone membrane; glutamate secretion; neurotransmitter uptake; synaptic vesicle priming; regulation of establishment of protein localization; neurotransmitter secretion; long-term potentiation; chemical synaptic transmission; positive regulation of synaptic plasticity; neutrophil degranulation; short-term synaptic potentiation; exocytic insertion of neurotransmitter receptor to postsynaptic membrane; neurotransmitter receptor internalization; exocytosis; vesicle fusion; potassium ion transmembrane transport
Sources:Amigo / QuickGO
Orthologs
Databases	NCBI: entry; OMA: entry
Species	Human	Mouse
Entrez	6616	20614
Ensembl	ENSG00000132639	ENSMUSG00000027273
UniProt	P60880	P60879
RefSeq (mRNA)	NM_003081; NM_130811; NM_001322902; NM_001322903; NM_001322904 NM_001322905; NM_001322906; NM_001322907; NM_001322908; NM_001322909; NM_001322910	NM_011428; NM_001291056; NM_001355254; NM_001355255
RefSeq (protein)	NP_001309831; NP_001309832; NP_001309833; NP_001309834; NP_001309835 NP_001309836; NP_001309837; NP_001309838; NP_001309839; NP_003072; NP_570824	NP_001277985; NP_035558; NP_001342183; NP_001342184
Location (UCSC)	Chr 20: 10.17 – 10.31 Mb	Chr 2: 136.56 – 136.62 Mb
PubMed search
- Wikidata
View/Edit Human	View/Edit Mouse

Synaptosomal-Associated Protein, 25kDa (SNAP-25) is a Target Soluble NSF (N-ethylmaleimide-sensitive factor) Attachment Protein Receptor (t-SNARE) protein encoded by the SNAP25 gene found on chromosome 20p12.2 in humans. SNAP-25 is a component of the trans-SNARE complex, which accounts for membrane fusion specificity and directly executes fusion by forming a tight complex that brings the synaptic vesicle and plasma membranes together.

== Structure and function ==
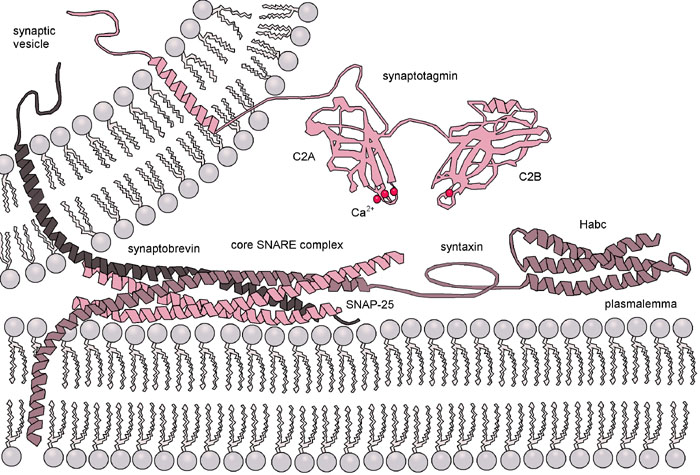
Molecular machinery driving exocytosis in neuromediator release. The core SNARE complex is formed by four α-helices contributed by synaptobrevin, syntaxin and SNAP-25. Synaptotagmin serves as a Ca^{2+} sensor and intimately regulates SNARE zipping.

SNAP-25, a Q-SNARE protein, is anchored to the cytosolic face of membranes via palmitoyl side chains covalently bound to cysteine amino acid residues in the central linker domain of the molecule. This means that SNAP-25 does not contain a trans-membrane domain.

SNAP-25 has been identified to contribute two α-helices to the SNARE complex, a four-α-helix domain complex. The SNARE complex participates in vesicle fusion, which involves the docking, priming and merging of a vesicle with the cell membrane to initiate an exocytotic event. Synaptobrevin, a protein that is a part of the vesicle-associated membrane protein (VAMP) family, and syntaxin-1 also help form the SNARE complex by each contributing a single α-helix. SNAP-25 assembles with synaptobrevin and syntaxin-1, and the selective binding of these proteins enables vesicle docking and fusion to occur at active zones on the plasma membrane. The energy needed for fusion to occur, results from the assembly of the SNARE proteins along with additional Sec1/Munc18-like (SM) proteins.

To form the SNARE complex, synaptobrevin, syntaxin-1, and SNAP-25 associate and begin to wrap around each other to form a coiled coil quaternary structure. The α-helices of both synaptobrevin and syntaxin-1 bind to those of SNAP-25. Synaptobrevin binds the α-helix near the C-terminus of SNAP-25, while syntaxin-1 binds the α-helix near the N-terminus. Dissociation of the SNARE complex is driven by ATPase N-ethylmaleimide-sensitive fusion (NSF) protein.

SNAP-25 inhibits presynaptic P-, Q-, and L-type voltage-gated calcium channels and interacts with the synaptotagmin C2B domain in a Ca^{2+}-independent fashion. In glutamatergic synapses, SNAP-25 decreases the Ca^{2+} responsiveness, while it is normally absent in GABAergic synapses.

Two isoforms (mRNA splice variants) of SNAP-25 exist, which are SNAP-25a and SNAP-25b. The two isoforms differ by nine amino acid residues, including a re-localization of one of the four palmitoylated cysteine residues involved in membrane attachment. The major characteristics of these two forms are outlined in the table below.

	SNAP25a	SNAP25b
Structure	N-terminal α-helix Random coil linker region with four cysteines clustered towards the center C-terminal α-helix	N-terminal α-helix Random coil linker region with four cysteines clustered towards the C-terminus C-terminal α-helix
Expression	Major SNAP-25 isoform in embryos and developing neural tissue Minimal expression in adult tissue except in pituitary and adrenal gland tissues	Minimal expression during development, major isoform in adult neural tissue
Localization	Diffuse	Localized to terminals and varicosities

SNAP-25 not only plays a role in synaptogenesis and the exocytotic release of neurotransmitters, but it also affects spine morphogenesis and density, post synaptic receptor trafficking and neuronal plasticity. Other non-neuronal processes such as metabolism can also be affected by SNAP-25 protein expression.

== Clinical significance ==
=== Developmental and epileptic encephalopathies (DEEs) ===
Individuals harboring pathogenic heterozygous de novo missense or loss-of-function variants in SNAP-25 often present with an early-onset developmental and epileptic encephalopathy. The core symptoms comprise intellectual disability ranging between mild to profound and early-onset seizures mostly occurring before the age of two years. Further recurrent symptoms include movement disorders, cerebral visual impairment, and brain atrophy. Electrophysiological studies identified aberrant spontaneous neurotransmission as causative and suggest that structurally clustered pathogenic variants lead to similar synaptic phenotypes.

=== Attention Deficit Hyperactivity Disorder (ADHD) ===
Consistent with the regulation of synaptic Ca^{2+} responsiveness, heterozygous deletion of the SNAP-25 gene in mice results in a hyperactive phenotype similar to attention deficit hyperactivity disorder (ADHD). In heterozygous mice, a decrease in hyperactivity is observed with dextroamphetamine (or Dexedrine), an active ingredient in the ADHD drug Adderall. Homozygous deletions of the SNAP-25 gene are lethal. An additional study indicated that incorporation of a SNAP-25 transgene back into the heterozygous SNAP-25 mutant mouse can rescue normal activity levels similar to wildtype mice. This suggests that low protein levels of SNAP-25 can be a cause of hyper-kinetic behavior. Subsequent studies have suggested that at least some of the SNAP-25 gene mutations in humans might predispose to ADHD. Identification of polymorphisms in the 3' untranslated region of the SNAP-25 gene was established in linkage studies with families that had been pre-diagnosed ADHD.

=== Schizophrenia ===
Studies in the post mortem brains of patients with Schizophrenia have shown that altered protein levels of SNAP-25 are specific to regions of the brain. Reduced SNAP-25 protein expression has been observed in the hippocampus as well as an area of the frontal lobe known as Broadman's area 10 whereas SNAP-25 expression has increased in both the cingulate cortex and prefrontal lobe of Broadman's area 9. The varying levels of SNAP-25 protein found in different areas of the brain have been thought to contribute to the conflicting psychological behaviors (depressive vs. hyperactive) expressed in some Schizophrenic patients.

The blind-drunk (Bdr) mouse model which has a point mutations in the SNAP-25b protein has provided a complex phenotype involving behaviors such as an abnormal circadian rhythm, uncoordinated gait, and disinterest in new objects/toys. Another mouse model generated from Cre-LoxP recombination, showed that conditional knockout (cKO) of the SNAP-25 gene in the forebrain, showed inactive SNAP-25 gene expression in glutamatergic neurons. However, significant glutamate levels were found in the cortex of these cKO mice. These mice also exhibited deficient social skills, impaired learning and memory, enhanced kinesthetic activity, a reduced startle response, impaired self-care, nursing ability and nest-building skills. Antipsychotic drugs such as Clozapine and Riluzole have been shown to significantly reduce the schizophrenic phenotype expressed in SNAP-25 cKO mice.

=== Alzheimer's disease ===
Individuals with Alzhiemer's disease have been shown to have decreased presynaptic protein levels and impaired synaptic function in neurons. SNAP-25 can be used as a biomarker in the cerebral spinal fluid (CSF) of patients exhibiting different variations of Alzheimer's disease (prodromal Alzheimer's and overt Alzheimer's). Increased levels of SNAP-25 protein were observed in patients with Alzheimer's compared to control individuals. Additionally, the presence of truncated SNAP-25 protein can be seen in the CSF of some patients with this disease. In five distinct regions of the brain, low levels of SNAP-25 can be seen in patients with Alzheimer's.

=== Bipolar disorder ===
A single nucleotide polymorphism in the SNAP-25 gene promoter has been shown to influence the expression levels of the SNAP-25b isoform in the prefrontal cortex. Increased levels of SNAP-25b have been shown to impair synaptic transmission and maturation which could lead to early-onset bipolar disorder (EOBD).The most abundant isoform of SNAP-25 is SNAP-25a during the early weeks of development in mice however in adulthood there is a change and the SNAP-25b isoform increases in the brain. This is shown to correlate with adolescent humans being increasingly diagnosed with EOBD during puberty. It has been suggested that early-onset bipolar disorder is more closely linked to Schizophrenia than to Bipolar Disorder itself. The single nucleotide polymorphism of SNAP-25 (rs6039769) associated with EOBD has been shown to increase the risk of patients developing Schizophrenia.

=== Botulism ===
A genome wide association study pointed to the rs362584 polymorphism in the gene as possibly associated with the personality trait neuroticism. Botulinum toxins A, C and E cleave SNAP-25, leading to paralysis in clinically developed botulism.

=== Epilepsy ===
Deletion of the SNAP-25b isoform has been shown to cause developmental abnormalities and seizures in mice. High levels of SNAP-25a and the protein syntaxin appear to be linked to seizures found in infantile-epilepsy. SNAP-25 knock-in mice have distinct phenotypic behavior similar to the fits and seizures of epileptic patients, as well as anxiety.

=== Learning disabilities ===
In the coloboma hyperactive mutant mouse model where SNAP-25 protein levels are reduced to 50% of the normal level, depolarized neurotransmitter release of dopamine and serotonin were reduced as well as glutamate release. The reduction in glutamate levels can lead to deficient memory and increased learning disabilities. Certain polymorphisms of SNAP-25 (rs363043, rs353016, rs363039, rs363050) have been shown to affect the cognitive behavior, specifically the Intelligence Quotient (IQ)), of patients without pre-existing neurological diseases.

=== Neonatal development ===
SNAP-25 protein expression can be altered by sex hormone levels in neonatal rats. Male rats that received an antiestrogen drug showed a 30% decrease in SNAP-25 levels and females treated with estrogen or testosterone showed a 30% increase in SNAP-25 levels. This suggests that synaptosomal proteins, such as SNAP-25, may have a dependence on neonatal hormone levels during brain development in rats. An additional study, showed that SNAP-25 levels in the hippocampus of the brain in neonatal mice were altered if the mother had been exposed to human influenza virus during pregnancy.

== Impact in other non-humans ==
Loss is lethal to Drosophila, but can be fully substituted by overexpression of the related SNAP-24.

== Interactive pathway map ==
Click on genes, proteins and metabolites below to link to respective articles. (Note: The interactive pathway map can be edited at WikiPathways: "NicotineDopaminergic_WP1602".)

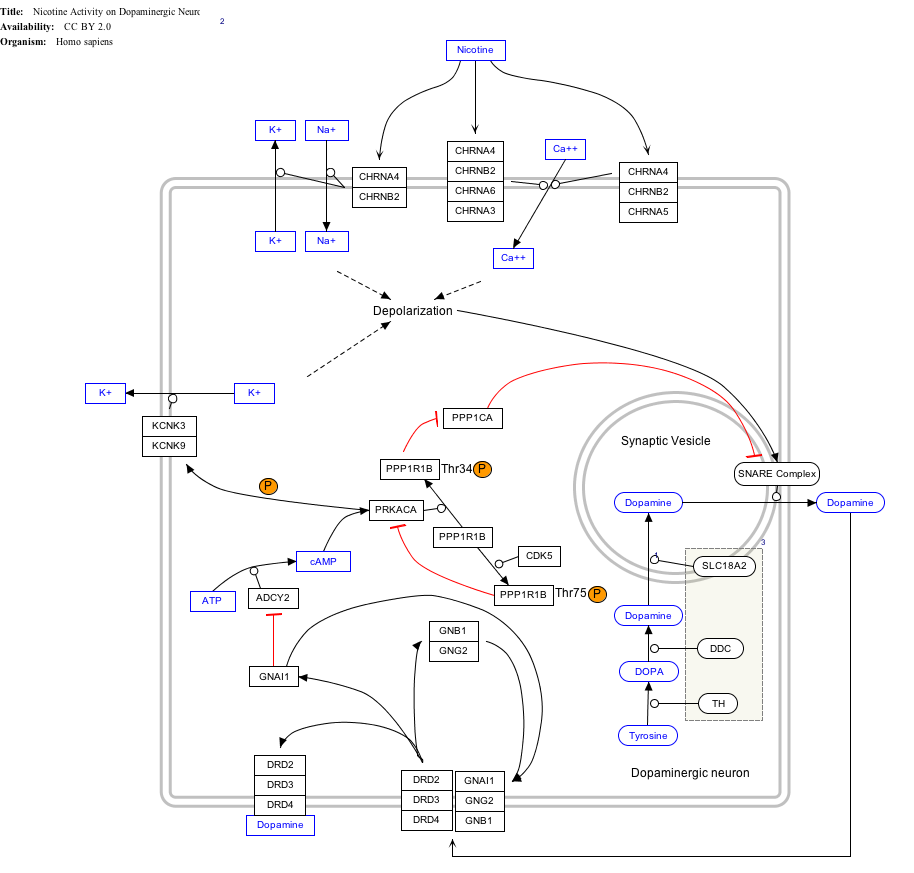

Nicotine Activity on Dopaminergic Neurons edit

== Interactions ==
SNAP-25 has been shown to interact with:

- CPLX1,
- ITSN1,
- KIF5B,
- SNAPAP and
- STX11,
- STX1A,
- STX2,
- STX4,
- SYT1,
- Syntaxin 3,
- TRIM9, and
- VAMP2.
- Synaptotagmin binds SNAP-25 and syntaxins in the presence of Ca^{2+} (and thus the entire SNARE complex)
