= STX7 =

Human protein and coding gene

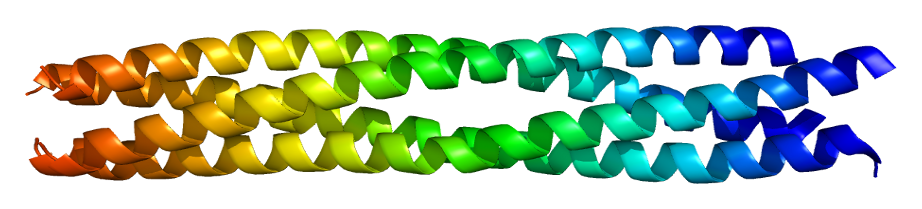

Identifiers
- Aliases: STX7, syntaxin 7
- External IDs: OMIM: 603217; MGI: 1858210; GeneCards: STX7
Available structures
PDB	Ortholog search: PDBe RCSB
PDB	List of PDB id codes 1GL2

Gene location (Human)
Chr.	Chromosome 6 (human)
Band	6q23.2	Start	132,445,867 bp
Band	6q23.2	End	132,513,198 bp

Gene location (Mouse)
Chr.	Chromosome 10 (mouse)
Band	10|10 A4	Start	24,025,200 bp
Band	10|10 A4	End	24,066,120 bp
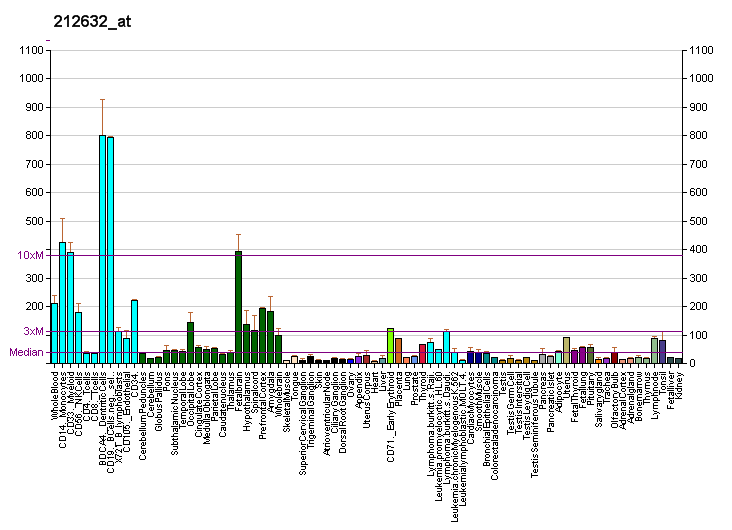

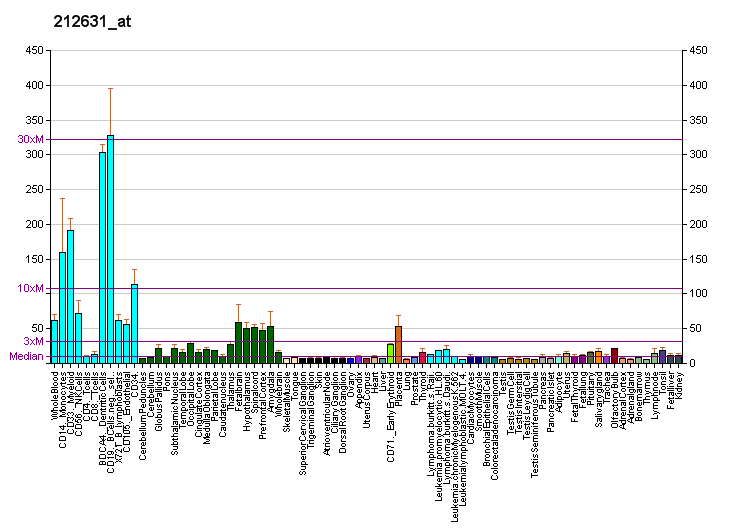

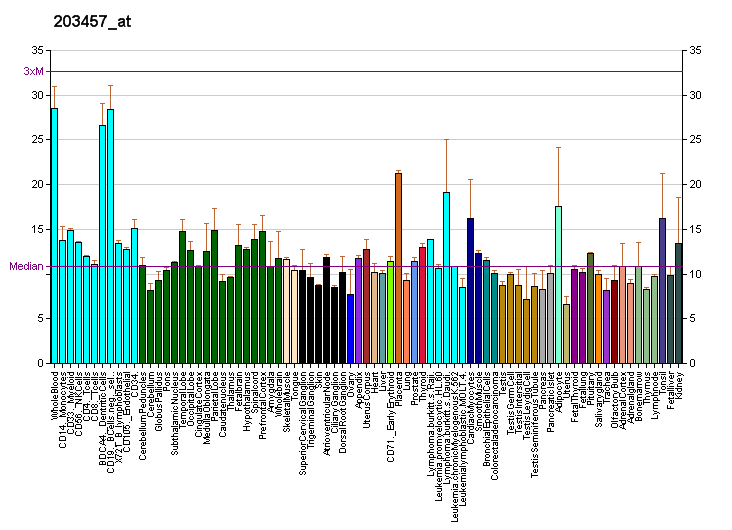
RNA expression pattern
Bgee	Human / Mouse (ortholog); Top expressed in: endothelial cell; monocyte; tendon of biceps brachii; Achilles tendon; middle temporal gyrus; ganglionic eminence; amniotic fluid; internal globus pallidus; glomerulus; secondary oocyte / Top expressed in: yolk sac; dentate gyrus of hippocampal formation granule cell; submandibular gland; stroma of bone marrow; right kidney; trigeminal ganglion; granulocyte; conjunctival fornix; barrel cortex; substantia nigra; More reference expression data
BioGPS	More reference expression data
Gene ontology
Molecular function	SNAP receptor activity; protein binding; chloride channel inhibitor activity; syntaxin binding; SNARE binding
Cellular component	integral component of membrane; recycling endosome; vesicle; endosome; late endosome; early endosome membrane; membrane; tertiary granule; plasma membrane; endocytic vesicle; lysosomal membrane; SNARE complex; azurophil granule; early endosome; immunological synapse; perinuclear region of cytoplasm; lysosome; extracellular exosome; synaptic vesicle; endomembrane system
Biological process	positive regulation of receptor localization to synapse; organelle localization; positive regulation of T cell mediated cytotoxicity; vesicle docking; organelle assembly; intracellular protein transport; vesicle fusion; vesicle-mediated transport; regulation of protein localization to plasma membrane; regulation of molecular function
Sources:Amigo / QuickGO
Orthologs
Databases	NCBI: entry; OMA: entry
Species	Human	Mouse
Entrez	8417	53331
Ensembl	ENSG00000079950	ENSMUSG00000019998
UniProt	O15400	O70439; Q8BH40
RefSeq (mRNA)	NM_003569; NM_001326578; NM_001326579; NM_001326580	NM_016797; NM_001358563
RefSeq (protein)	NP_001313507; NP_001313508; NP_001313509; NP_003560	NP_058077; NP_001345492
Location (UCSC)	Chr 6: 132.45 – 132.51 Mb	Chr 10: 24.03 – 24.07 Mb
PubMed search
- Wikidata
View/Edit Human	View/Edit Mouse

Syntaxin-7 is a protein that in humans is encoded by the STX7 gene.

In melanocytic cells STX7 gene expression may be regulated by MITF.

== Interactions ==
STX7 has been shown to interact with STX8, VPS18, Vesicle-associated membrane protein 8 and VPS11.
