= STX1B =

Protein-coding gene in the species Homo sapiens

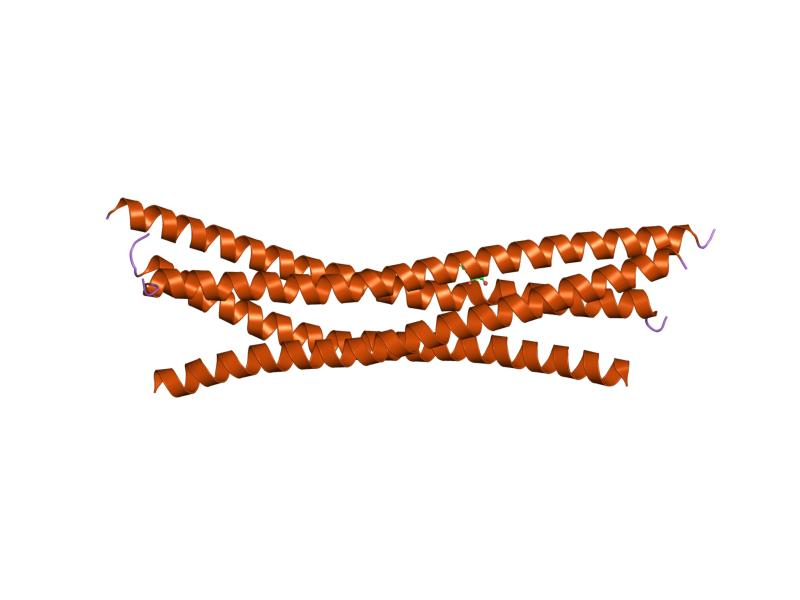

Identifiers
- Aliases: STX1B, STX1B1, STX1B2, GEFSP9, syntaxin 1B
- External IDs: OMIM: 601485; MGI: 1930705; GeneCards: STX1B

Gene location (Human)
Chr.	Chromosome 16 (human)
Band	16p11.2	Start	30,989,256 bp
Band	16p11.2	End	31,010,638 bp

Gene location (Mouse)
Chr.	Chromosome 7 (mouse)
Band	7|7 F3	Start	127,403,072 bp
Band	7|7 F3	End	127,423,721 bp
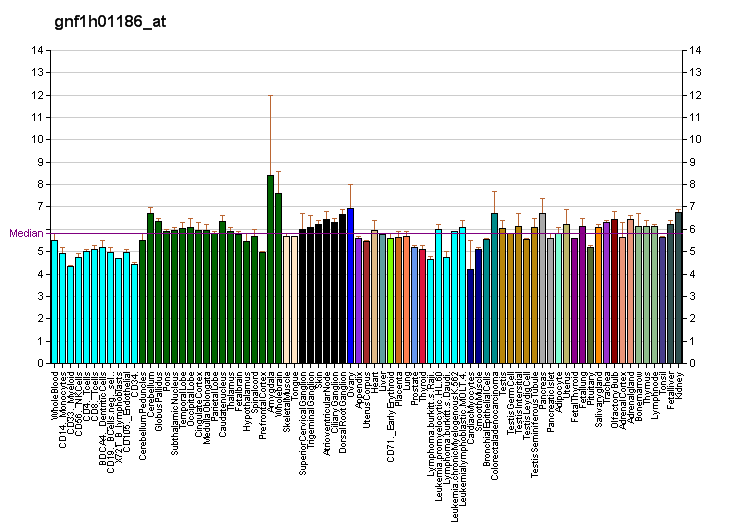
RNA expression pattern
Bgee	Human / Mouse (ortholog); Top expressed in: right hemisphere of cerebellum; right frontal lobe; Brodmann area 9; prefrontal cortex; cingulate gyrus; anterior cingulate cortex; postcentral gyrus; superior frontal gyrus; nucleus accumbens; hypothalamus / Top expressed in: superior frontal gyrus; cerebellar cortex; dentate gyrus of hippocampal formation granule cell; pontine nuclei; dorsal tegmental nucleus; dorsomedial hypothalamic nucleus; cerebellar vermis; medial vestibular nucleus; lobe of cerebellum; subiculum; More reference expression data
BioGPS	More reference expression data
Gene ontology
Molecular function	SNAP receptor activity; protein kinase binding; signaling receptor binding; SNARE binding; protein domain specific binding
Cellular component	integral component of membrane; cytosol; membrane; synaptic vesicle; plasma membrane; spindle; microtubule organizing center; SNARE complex; cytoskeleton; nuclear lamina; nucleus; nucleoplasm; centrosome; cytoplasm; presynaptic membrane; presynapse; presynaptic active zone membrane; axon; neuromuscular junction; endomembrane system
Biological process	synaptic vesicle docking; spontaneous neurotransmitter secretion; positive regulation of neurotransmitter secretion; regulation of exocytosis; vesicle docking; positive regulation of excitatory postsynaptic potential; regulation of gene expression; protein transport; intracellular protein transport; neurotransmitter transport; vesicle-mediated transport; regulation of synaptic vesicle priming; negative regulation of neuron projection development; regulation of synaptic activity; vesicle docking involved in exocytosis; calcium ion-regulated exocytosis of neurotransmitter; protein localization to membrane; negative regulation of synaptic vesicle recycling; positive regulation of spontaneous neurotransmitter secretion; negative regulation of macropinocytosis; synaptic vesicle fusion to presynaptic active zone membrane; exocytic insertion of neurotransmitter receptor to postsynaptic membrane; synaptic vesicle exocytosis; exocytosis; vesicle fusion
Sources:Amigo / QuickGO
Orthologs
Databases	NCBI: entry; OMA: entry
Species	Human	Mouse
Entrez	112755	56216
Ensembl	ENSG00000099365	ENSMUSG00000030806
UniProt	P61266	P61264
RefSeq (mRNA)	NM_052874	NM_024414
RefSeq (protein)	NP_443106	NP_077725
Location (UCSC)	Chr 16: 30.99 – 31.01 Mb	Chr 7: 127.4 – 127.42 Mb
PubMed search
- Wikidata
View/Edit Human	View/Edit Mouse

Syntaxin-1B is a protein that in humans is encoded by the STX1B gene.

== Interactions ==
STX1B has been shown to interact with UNC13B.
