= List of diseases (I) =

This is a list of diseases starting with the letter "I".

== I ==
- I cell disease

== Ib ==
- IBIDS syndrome

== Ic ==
=== Icf ===
- ICF syndrome

=== Ich ===
- Ichthyoallyeinotoxism
- Ichthyophobia
- Ichthyosiform erythroderma corneal involvement deafness
- Ichthyosis alopecia eclabion ectropion mental retardation
- Ichthyosis and male hypogonadism
- Ichthyosis bullosa of Siemens
- Ichthyosis cheek eyebrow syndrome
- Ichthyosis congenita biliary atresia
- Ichthyosis deafness mental retardation skeletal anomaly
- Ichthyosis follicularis atrichia photophobia syndrome
- Ichthyosis hepatosplenomegaly cerebellar degeneration
- Ichthyosis hystrix, Curth Macklin type
- Ichthyosis linearis circumflexa
- Ichthyosis male hypogonadism
- Ichthyosis mental retardation Devriendt type
- Ichthyosis mental retardation dwarfism renal impairment
- Ichthyosis microphthalmos
- Ichthyosis tapered fingers midline groove up
- Ichthyosis vulgaris
- Ichthyosis, erythrokeratolysis hemalis
- Ichthyosis, keratosis follicularis spinulosa Decalvans
- Ichthyosis, lamellar recessive
- Ichthyosis, Netherton syndrome

== Id ==
- Idaho syndrome
- Idiopathic acute eosinophilic pneumonia
- Idiopathic adolescent scoliosis
- Idiopathic adult neutropenia
- Idiopathic alveolar hypoventilation syndrome
- Idiopathic congenital nystagmus, dominant, X- linked
- Idiopathic diffuse interstitial fibrosis
- Idiopathic dilatation of the pulmonary artery
- Idiopathic dilation cardiomyopathy
- Idiopathic double athetosis
- Idiopathic edema
- Idiopathic eosinophilic chronic pneumopathy
- Idiopathic facial palsy
- Idiopathic hypereosinophilic syndrome
- Idiopathic infection caused by BCG or atypical mycobacteria
- Idiopathic juvenile osteoporosis
- Idiopathic pulmonary fibrosis
- Idiopathic pulmonary haemosiderosis
- Idiopathic sclerosing mesenteritis
- Idiopathic thrombocytopenic purpura
- Iduronate 2-sulfatase deficiency

== Ie–Im ==
- IFAP syndrome
- IgA deficiency
- IgA nephropathy
- IgA vasculitis
- IGDA syndrome
- IgG4-related disease
- Illum syndrome
- Illyngophobia
- Ilyina–Amoashy–Grygory syndrome
- Imaizumi–Kuroki syndrome
- Iminoglycinuria
- Immotile cilia syndrome, due to defective radial spokes
- Immotile cilia syndrome, due to excessively long cilia
- Immotile cilia syndrome, Kartagener type
- Immune deficiency, familial variable
- Immune thrombocytopenia
- Immunodeficiency, primary
- Immunodeficiency, secondary
- Immunodeficiency with short limb dwarfism
- Immunodeficiency, microcephaly with normal intelligence
- Imperforate anus
- Imperforate oropharynx costo vertebral anomalies
- Impetigo

== In ==
=== In ===
- Inactive colon

=== In–Inz ===
- Inborn amino acid metabolism disorder
- Inborn branched chain aminoaciduria
- Inborn error of metabolism
- Inborn metabolic disorder
- Inborn renal aminoaciduria
- Inborn urea cycle disorder
- Incisors fused
- Inclusion-cell disease
- Inclusion conjunctivitis
- Incontinentia pigmenti (Bloch-Sulzberger syndrome)
- Incontinentia pigmenti achromians
- Indomethacin antenatal infection
- Induced delusional disorder

=== Inf–Inh ===
- Infant epilepsy with migrant focal crisis
- Infant respiratory distress syndrome
- Infantile apnea
- Infantile axonal neuropathy
- Infantile convulsions and paroxysmal choreoathetosis, familial
- Infantile digital fibromatosis
- Infantile dysphagia
- Infantile multisystem inflammatory disease
- Infantile myofibromatosis
- Infantile onset spinocerebellar ataxia
- Infantile recurrent chronic multifocal osteomyolitis
- Infantile sialic acid storage disorder
- Infantile spasms broad thumbs
- Infantile spasms
- Infantile striato thalamic degeneration
- Infectious arthritis
- Infectious gastroenteritis
- Infectious myocarditis
- Infective endocarditis
- Inflammatory breast cancer
- Infundibulopelvic stenosis multicystic kidney
- Influenza
- Inguinal hernia
- Inhalant abuse

- Inhalant abuse, aliphatic hydrocarbons
- Inhalant abuse, aromatic hydrocarbons
- Inhalant abuse, ketones
- Inhalant abuse, haloalkanes
- Inhalant abuse, nitrites

=== Ins ===
- Congenital insensitivity to pain
- Instability mitotic non disjunction syndrome
- Insulinoma
- Insulin-resistance type B
- Insulin-resistant acanthosis nigricans, type A

=== Int ===
- Intercellular cholesterol esterification disease
- Interferon gamma, receptor 1, deficiency
- Internal carotid agenesis
- Intraocular lymphoma
- Interstitial cystitis
- Interstitial lung disease
- Interstitial pneumonia
- Intestinal atresia multiple
- Intestinal lipodystrophy (Whipple's disease)
- Intestinal lymphangiectasia
- Intestinal malrotation facial anomalies familial type
- Intestinal pseudoobstruction chronic idiopathic
- Intestinal pseudo-obstruction
- Intestinal spirochetosis
- Intoeing
- Intracranial aneurysms multiple congenital anomaly
- Intracranial arteriovenous malformations
- Intractable singultus
- Intrathoracic kidney vertebral fusion
- Intrauterine growth retardation mandibular malar hypoplasia
- Intrauterine infections
- Intrinsic factor, congenital deficiency of

=== Inv ===
- Inverted Gentile Disorder

== Io–Iv ==
- Iodine antenatal infection
- Iodine deficiency
- Iophobia
- Iridocyclitis
- Iridogoniodysgenesis, dominant type
- Iris dysplasia hypertelorism deafness
- Iritis
- Iron deficiency
- Iron deficiency anemia
- Iron overload
- Irons–Bhan syndrome
- Irritable bowel syndrome
- Isaacs–Mertens syndrome
- Isaacs syndrome
- Ischiadic hypoplasia renal dysfunction immunodeficiency
- Ischiopatellar dysplasia Isochromosome 18p syndrome
- Isochromosome i (5p)
- Isochromosome 18p syndrome
- Isosporosiasis
- Isotretinoin embryopathy
- Isthmian coarctation
- Ivemark syndrome
- Ivic syndrome
