= Generalized periodic epileptiform discharges =

Abnormal EEG pattern

Generalized periodic epileptiform discharges (GPEDs) are very rare abnormal patterns found in EEG.

== Types ==
Based on the interval between the discharges they are classified as:

- Periodic short-interval diffuse discharges (PSIDDs)
- Periodic long-interval diffuse discharges (PLIDDs)
- Burst suppression patterns
