= Corectopia =

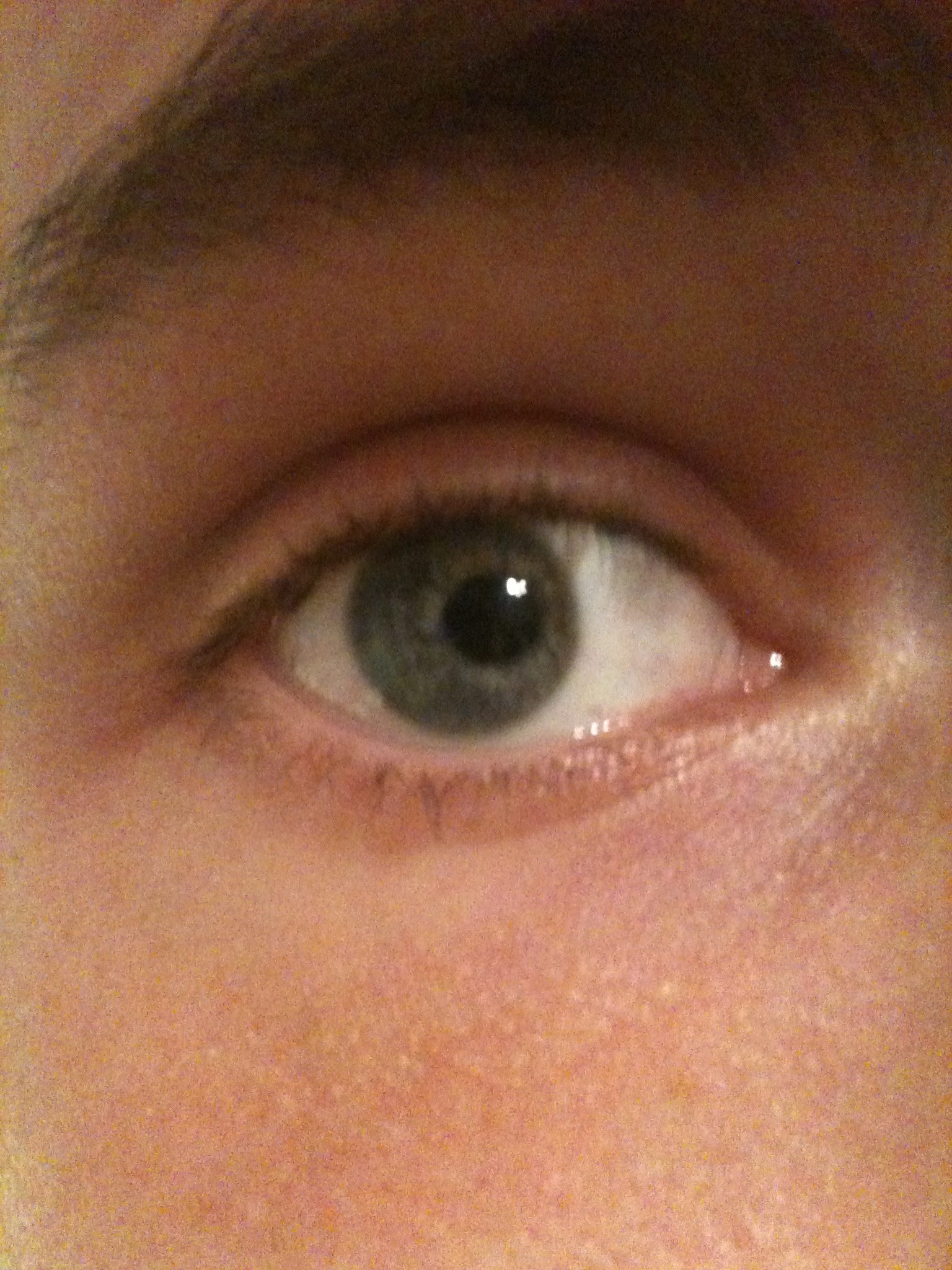
- An eye with an off-centered pupil
- Specialty: Ophthalmology

Corectopia is the displacement of the eye's pupil from its normal, central position. It may be associated with high myopia or ectopia lentis, among other conditions. Medical or surgical intervention may be indicated for the treatment of corectopia in some cases.

== See also ==
- Eye injury
- Iridodialysis
- Monocular diplopia
- Polycoria
- Axenfeld-Rieger syndrome
