= Acorea =

Absence of pupil

Acorea or acoria is an eye disease defined as the absence of the pupil, unilaterally or bilaterally. It can be birth defect, which is very rare, as is the case with iridocorneal dysgenesis or due to a persistent pupillary membrane. and also acquired origin, product of a pathology or injury that is affecting the iris, such as inflammation or ocular trauma. It must be differentiated from pupillary pseudoacorea or pseudoacoria or "hidden pupil", which is a rare condition in which the pupil is not visible at rest and only becomes evident after pharmacological mydriasis. This distinguishes it from true acorea, in which the pupil is completely absent.

Surgical interventions for acorea are sometimes undertaken in the context of Axenfeld–Rieger syndrome.

== See also ==
- Iridodialysis
- Monocular diplopia
