= Malignant migrating partial seizures in infancy =

- Other names: Epilepsy of infancy with migrating focal seizures, migrating partial seizures of infancy

Malignant migrating partial seizures of infancy (MMPSI) is a rare epileptic syndrome that onsets before 6 months of age, commonly in the first few weeks of life. Once seizures start, the site of seizure activity repeatedly migrates from one area of the brain to another, with few periods of remission in between. These seizures are 'focal' (updated term for 'partial'), meaning they do not affect both sides of the brain at the same time. These continuous seizures cause damage to the brain, hence the descriptor 'malignant.'

The cause often is not known, although mutation of the KCNT1 gene has shown to be associated. Another gene implicated is PLCB1. MMPSI is diagnosed based on signs, symptoms, and electroencephalogram (EEG) findings. As of 2012, 80 cases have been reported. It was first described in 1995 by Copolla et al.

== Signs and symptoms ==
=== Characteristics and classification ===
MMPSI is characterized by seizures that onset between the 1st week of life and 7 months of age, with average age of onset being 3 months. These seizures are nearly continuous, without interposed periods of remission, and involve independent areas of either side of the brain. These seizures result in psychomotor delay, which is a child failing to meet developmental milestones on time, ultimately resulting in intellectual disability.

The International League Against Epilepsy (ILAE) classifies MMPSI as an 'electroclinical syndrome.' Each electroclinical syndrome is a disease that is distinguishable from others on the basis of age of onset of seizures, seizure types, electroencephalogram (EEG) findings, and various other clinical features. Electroclinical syndromes are primarily classified by age of onset, in which MMPSI is preceded by Ohtahara syndrome and succeeded by West syndrome, which onset in the neonatal and infancy periods, respectively.

It may also be considered an 'epileptic encephalopathy,' diseases in which unremitting epileptic activity leads to severe cognitive and behavioral impairments. When categorized based on age of onset, it is grouped together with early infantile epileptic encephalopathy (EIEE, same as Ohtahara syndrome), early myoclonic encephalopathy (EME), and infantile spasms (IS, same West syndrome).

=== Disease phases ===
Age of onset of each phase
Phase	Age range
first	1 week to 7 months
second	3 weeks to 10 months
third	shortly before 1 year to 5 years

MMPSI has been described to have three phases.

In the first phase, seizures are sporadic and typically only affect motor function.

The second phase is termed the "stormy phase." Seizures become very frequent and polymorphous, meaning that seizures affect different parts of the body each time. Seizures can be so frequent that they appear to be continuous for weeks at a time.

In the third phase, seizures are characteristically absent. However, recurrent seizures and status epilepticus can still occur.

== Genetics ==
The cause often is not known, although mutation of the KCNT1 gene has shown to be causative. Another gene implicated is PLCB1.

== Pathophysiology ==
The mechanism of disease development is largely unknown, although tissue studies, biochemical studies, and imaging studies provide some insight.

=== Histology ===
Histology is the study of tissue samples using a microscope and special stains. Tissue samples of the brain can be normal. Scarring of the brain, termed gliosis, has been observed, specifically in the CA1 section of the pyramidal layer of the hippocampus.

=== Radiology ===
Radiology is the use of x-rays and radiowaves to create images of the body. At the beginning of the disease, computed tomography (CT) and magnetic resonance imaging (MRI) images are normal. Eventually there can be enlargement of subarachnoid and ventricular spaces of the brain (ie, the areas of the brain that contain fluid rather than brain tissue). Mesial temporal sclerosis has also been observed.

== Diagnosis ==
The diagnosis of MMPSI is based on seizure types, age of onset, and EEG findings. It is diagnosed when the aforementioned most closely match MMPSI, as opposed to other electroclinical syndromes or epileptic encephalopathies.

=== Electroencephalogram ===
EEG during seizures (ictal EEG) shows focal discharges that migrate. They can either migrate to a contiguous area of the brain, or migrate to a noncontiguous area of the same or opposite side of the brain.

EEG between seizures (interictal EEG) shows increasing diffuse slowing of background activity, with a prevalence of slow waves often shifting from one hemisphere to the other. As seizures become more frequent, the interictal phase can no longer be identified.

== Management ==
MMPSI is generally resistant to treatment with seizure medications. However, there is limited success with some pharmaceuticals

- Bromide therapy can sometimes achieve several months of remmission, although bromoderma tuberosum is a possible side effect.
- Stiripentol with clonazepam has mitigated seizures in some cases.
- Intravenous levetiracetam has shown to interrupt seizures in a few cases
- Combination of the above three have shown significant therapeutic response
- Rufinamide has shown potential efficacy
- Acetazolamide has shown potential efficacy

Vagus nerve stimulation has shown little benefit

ketogenic diet has shown benefit is some cases, including those with KCNT1 and SLC12A5 mutations, leading to reduction in seizure frequency and severity, and in some cases, hospital discharge after failed pharmacologic therapy. The ketogenic diet should be considered in patients unresponsive to multiple anti-seizure medications . [5]

Pharmaceuticals that possibly worsen disease include vigabatrin and carbamazepine.

== Therapeutic Research ==
In 2026, investigational antisense oligonucleotide therapy targeting KCNT1 was reported in two children with severe KCNT1 epileptic encephalopathy, while companion translational work supported the developmental and physiological rationale for KCNT1 knockdown in human neuronal models, including prenatal neurons.

== Prognosis ==
Prognosis is poor. One sixth of reported cases died during childhood, usually the result of status epilepticus and/or respiratory insufficiency. Nearly all children develop severe intellectual disability. Children generally are unable to use language. Some children can walk and grasp objects. Children may be able to continue to develop normally during seizure-free periods, but they typically rapidly deteriorate when "stormy periods" recur. However, some cases of only mild to moderate mental delay have been reported in the context of good seizure control. Those with better outcomes seem to have been borderline cases to begin with, as in the seizures were not as long-lasting and less migratory.

== Epidemiology ==
As of 2012, 80 cases have been reported.

== History ==
This syndrome was first described in 14 children by Coppola et al. in 1995 in Saint Vincent de Paul hospital in Paris.
