= STXBP1 =

Protein-coding gene in the species Homo sapiens

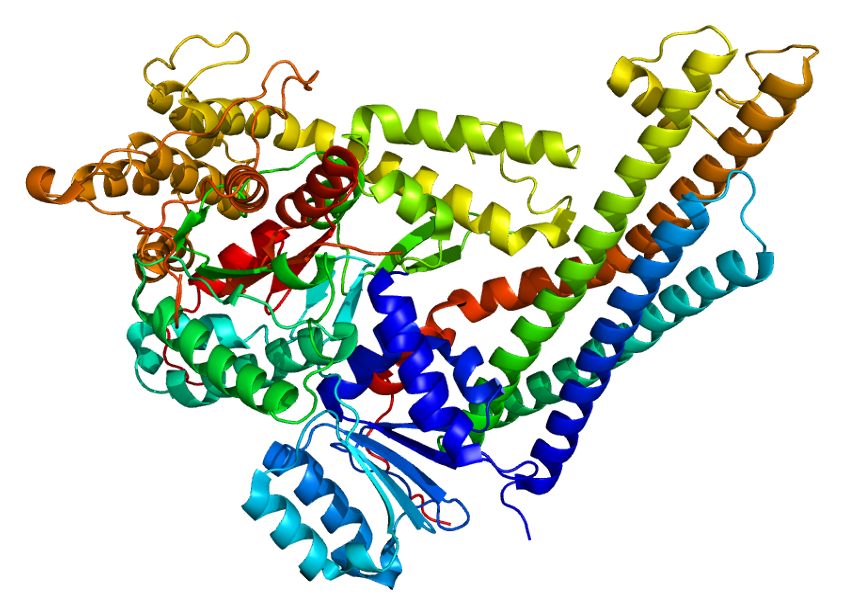

Identifiers
- Aliases: STXBP1, MUNC18-1, NSEC1, P67, RBSEC1, UNC18, syntaxin binding protein 1
- External IDs: OMIM: 602926; MGI: 107363; GeneCards: STXBP1
Available structures
| PDB | Ortholog search: PDBe RCSB |
| PDB | List of PDB id codes 3PUJ |

Gene location (Human)
| Chr. | Chromosome 9 (human) |
| Band | 9q34.11 | Start | 127,579,370 bp |
| Band | 9q34.11 | End | 127,696,027 bp |

Gene location (Mouse)
| Chr. | Chromosome 2 (mouse) |
| Band | 2 B|2 22.09 cM | Start | 32,677,614 bp |
| Band | 2 B|2 22.09 cM | End | 32,737,257 bp |
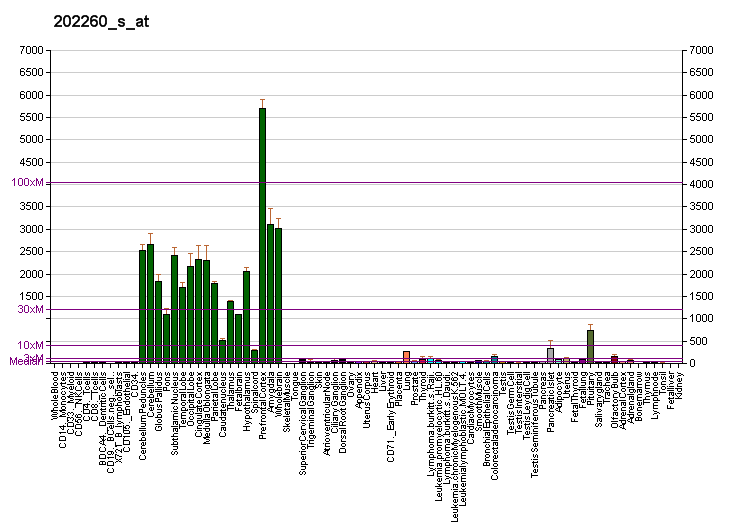
RNA expression pattern
| Bgee | Human / Mouse (ortholog); Top expressed in: middle temporal gyrus; lateral nuclear group of thalamus; Brodmann area 23; pons; superior frontal gyrus; primary visual cortex; right hemisphere of cerebellum; pars compacta; postcentral gyrus; paraflocculus of cerebellum / Top expressed in: neural layer of retina; pontine nuclei; inferior colliculi; perirhinal cortex; superior colliculus; central gray substance of midbrain; piriform cortex; medulla oblongata; cerebellar cortex; medial vestibular nucleus; More reference expression data |
| BioGPS | More reference expression data |
Gene ontology
| Molecular function | protein domain specific binding; protein N-terminus binding; syntaxin-1 binding; protein binding; identical protein binding; syntaxin binding; protein kinase binding; SNARE binding; RNA binding; phospholipase binding |
| Cellular component | platelet alpha granule; membrane; myelin sheath; plasma membrane; nucleoplasm; terminal bouton; mitochondrion; extracellular exosome; cytoplasm; cytosol; presynaptic active zone membrane; nucleus; cytoskeleton; axon; perinuclear region of cytoplasm; presynapse; postsynapse; protein-containing complex; phagocytic vesicle; glutamatergic synapse |
| Biological process | negative regulation of neuron apoptotic process; exocytosis; axon target recognition; protein stabilization; platelet degranulation; positive regulation of calcium ion-dependent exocytosis; glutamate secretion; regulation of synaptic vesicle fusion to presynaptic active zone membrane; neuromuscular synaptic transmission; negative regulation of synaptic transmission, GABAergic; long-term depression; protein transport; positive regulation of exocytosis; protein localization to plasma membrane; platelet aggregation; regulation of SNARE complex assembly; synaptic vesicle maturation; vesicle-mediated transport; neurotransmitter secretion; regulation of synaptic vesicle priming; vesicle docking involved in exocytosis; negative regulation of protein-containing complex assembly; presynaptic dense core vesicle exocytosis; developmental process involved in reproduction; regulation of vesicle fusion; response to estradiol; positive regulation of mast cell degranulation; positive regulation of vesicle docking; positive regulation of glutamate secretion, neurotransmission; transport; synaptic vesicle priming; cellular response to interferon-gamma; SNARE complex assembly; regulation of acrosomal vesicle exocytosis |
Sources:Amigo / QuickGO
Orthologs
| Databases | NCBI: entry; OMA: entry |
| Species | Human | Mouse |
| Entrez | 6812 | 20910 |
| Ensembl | ENSG00000136854 | ENSMUSG00000026797 |
| UniProt | P61764 | O08599 |
| RefSeq (mRNA) | NM_003165; NM_001032221 | NM_001113569; NM_009295 |
| RefSeq (protein) | NP_001027392; NP_003156; NP_001361235; NP_001361236; NP_001361237 NP_001361238; NP_001361239; NP_001361240; NP_001361241; NP_001361242; NP_001361243; NP_001361244 | NP_001107041; NP_033321 |
| Location (UCSC) | Chr 9: 127.58 – 127.7 Mb | Chr 2: 32.68 – 32.74 Mb |
| PubMed search |
- Wikidata
| View/Edit Human | View/Edit Mouse |

Syntaxin-binding protein 1 (also known as Munc18-1) is a protein that in humans is encoded by the STXBP1 gene. This gene encodes a syntaxin-binding protein. The encoded protein appears to play a role in release of neurotransmitters via regulation of syntaxin, a transmembrane attachment protein receptor. Mutations in this gene have been associated with neurological disorders including epilepsy, intellectual disability, and movement disorders.

== Structure ==
The STXBP1 gene is located on the q arm of chromosome 9 in position 34.11 and has 20 exons spanning 80,510 base pairs. The encoded protein is a peripheral membrane protein located in the cytosol. In the retina and cerebellum, an alternatively spliced transcript variant is expressed, containing an additional exon and totaling 603 amino acids. Alternative splicing can produce an isoform with exon 19 and an isoform without.

== Function ==
The encoded protein may participate in the regulation of synaptic vesicle docking and fusion, possibly through interaction with GTP-binding proteins. It is essential for neurotransmission and binds syntaxin, a component of the synaptic vesicle fusion machinery probably in a 1:1 ratio. It can interact with syntaxins 1, 2, and 3 but not syntaxin 4 and may play a role in determining the specificity of intracellular fusion reactions. This protein functions in a late stage of the intracellular membrane fusion process of exocytosis. Dissociation of this protein from syntaxin determines the kinetics of postfusion events. This protein is essential for presynpatic vesicle release and is rapidly phosphorylated by protein kinase C upon neuronal depolarization. The protein participates in the secretory pathway between the Golgi apparatus and cell membrane.

== Clinical significance ==
=== Epilepsy ===
Mutations in the STXBP1 cause early infantile epileptic encephalopathy type 4 (EIEE4), a severe form of epilepsy characterized by frequent tonic seizures or spasms beginning in infancy with a specific EEG finding of suppression-burst patterns, characterized by high-voltage bursts alternating with almost flat suppression phases. Affected individuals have neonatal or infantile onset of seizures, profound intellectual disability, and MRI evidence of brain hypomyelination. Inheritance of EIEE4 is autosomal dominant, but due to the severity of the condition most cases are de novo.

This gene was initially discovered in 2008 as cause for this severe form of epilepsy also called Ohtahara syndrome. Since then it has become one of the most prominent genes for epileptic encephalopathies, and is increasingly being associated with other forms of epilepsy.

=== Intellectual disability and movement disorders ===
STXBP1 variants are increasingly being identified in people with wider neurological problems, including intellectual disability or movement disorders without epilepsy.

=== Expression ===
In melanocytic cells STXBP1 gene expression may be regulated by MITF.

The STXBP1 gene is expressed in the brain and spinal cord and highly enriched in axons. Expression of this protein is highest in the retina and cerebellum.

== Interactions ==
The encoded protein binds SYTL4. STXBP1 has been shown to interact with STX2, STX4 and STX1A.
