= PITX2 =

Protein-coding gene in the species Homo sapiens

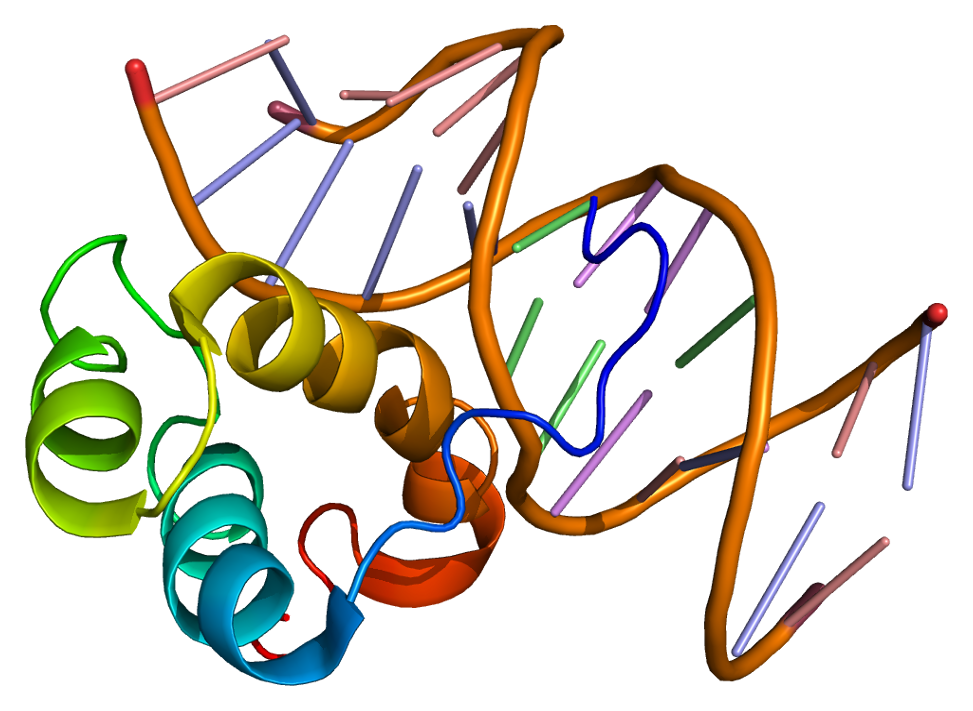

Identifiers
- Aliases: PITX2, ARP1, Brx1, IDG2, IGDS, IGDS2, IHG2, IRID2, Otlx2, PTX2, RGS, RIEG, RIEG1, RS, paired like homeodomain 2, ASGD4
- External IDs: OMIM: 601542; MGI: 109340; GeneCards: PITX2
Available structures
PDB	Ortholog search: PDBe RCSB
PDB	List of PDB id codes 2L7F, 2L7M, 2LKX

Gene location (Human)
Chr.	Chromosome 4 (human)
Band	4q25	Start	110,617,423 bp
Band	4q25	End	110,642,123 bp

Gene location (Mouse)
Chr.	Chromosome 3 (mouse)
Band	3 G3|3 57.84 cM	Start	128,993,527 bp
Band	3 G3|3 57.84 cM	End	129,013,240 bp
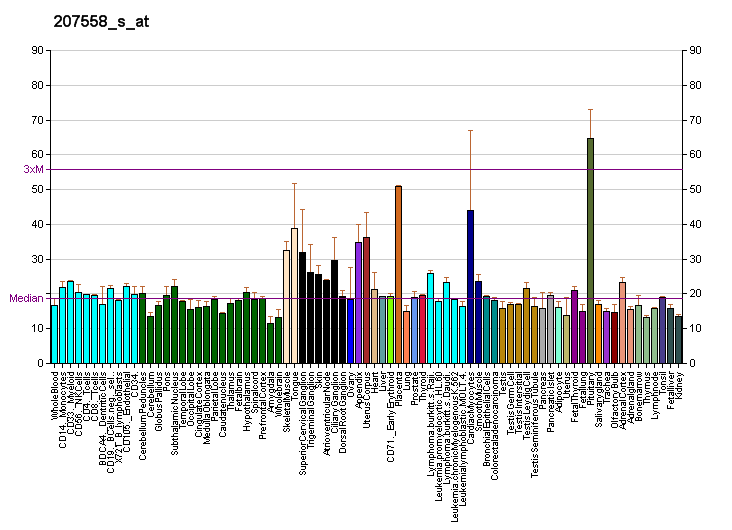
RNA expression pattern
Bgee	Human / Mouse (ortholog); Top expressed in: gums; biceps brachii; gingival epithelium; Skeletal muscle tissue of biceps brachii; muscle of thigh; Skeletal muscle tissue of rectus abdominis; body of tongue; gastrocnemius muscle; vastus lateralis muscle; pituitary gland / Top expressed in: tooth; molar; umbilical cord; subthalamus; mesoderm; labioscrotal swelling; abdominal wall; mammillary body; lateral plate mesoderm; ventral tegmental area; More reference expression data
BioGPS	More reference expression data
Gene ontology
Molecular function	identical protein binding; protein homodimerization activity; transcription cis-regulatory region binding; sequence-specific DNA binding; DNA binding; transcription coactivator activity; chromatin DNA binding; DNA-binding transcription activator activity, RNA polymerase II-specific; protein binding; RNA polymerase II cis-regulatory region sequence-specific DNA binding; chromatin binding; ribonucleoprotein complex binding; DNA-binding transcription factor activity; DNA-binding transcription repressor activity, RNA polymerase II-specific; transcription factor binding; phosphoprotein binding; DNA-binding transcription factor activity, RNA polymerase II-specific
Cellular component	nucleus; cytoplasm; transcription regulator complex; nucleoplasm
Biological process	response to vitamin A; female gonad development; vascular associated smooth muscle cell differentiation; regulation of transcription by RNA polymerase II; skeletal muscle tissue development; cell proliferation involved in outflow tract morphogenesis; prolactin secreting cell differentiation; in utero embryonic development; pituitary gland development; vasculogenesis; regulation of cell population proliferation; myoblast fusion; hair cell differentiation; spleen development; regulation of transcription, DNA-templated; transcription by RNA polymerase II; embryonic camera-type eye development; ventricular septum morphogenesis; endodermal digestive tract morphogenesis; determination of left/right symmetry; cardiac muscle tissue development; positive regulation of transcription, DNA-templated; subthalamic nucleus development; ventricular cardiac muscle cell development; left/right axis specification; hypothalamus cell migration; animal organ morphogenesis; regulation of cell migration; development of the heart; embryonic digestive tract morphogenesis; branching involved in blood vessel morphogenesis; cardiac muscle cell differentiation; digestive system development; multicellular organism development; atrioventricular valve development; pulmonary vein morphogenesis; cardiac neural crest cell migration involved in outflow tract morphogenesis; embryonic hindlimb morphogenesis; lung development; superior vena cava morphogenesis; positive regulation of DNA binding; extraocular skeletal muscle development; pulmonary myocardium development; deltoid tuberosity development; atrial cardiac muscle tissue morphogenesis; male gonad development; anatomical structure morphogenesis; brain development; neuron differentiation; odontogenesis of dentin-containing tooth; Wnt signaling pathway; left lung morphogenesis; somatotropin secreting cell differentiation; positive regulation of myoblast proliferation; camera-type eye development; response to hormone; odontogenesis; iris morphogenesis; neuron migration; negative regulation of transcription by RNA polymerase II; positive regulation of transcription by RNA polymerase II
Sources:Amigo / QuickGO
Orthologs
Databases	NCBI: entry; OMA: entry
Species	Human	Mouse
Entrez	5308	18741
Ensembl	ENSG00000164093	ENSMUSG00000028023
UniProt	Q99697	P97474
RefSeq (mRNA)	NM_000325; NM_001204397; NM_001204398; NM_001204399; NM_153426 NM_153427	NM_001042502; NM_001042504; NM_001286942; NM_001287048; NM_011098
RefSeq (protein)	NP_000316; NP_001191326; NP_001191327; NP_001191328; NP_700475 NP_700476	NP_001035967; NP_001035969; NP_001273871; NP_001273977; NP_035228
Location (UCSC)	Chr 4: 110.62 – 110.64 Mb	Chr 3: 128.99 – 129.01 Mb
PubMed search
- Wikidata
View/Edit Human	View/Edit Mouse

Paired-like homeodomain transcription factor 2 also known as pituitary homeobox 2 is a protein that in humans is encoded by the PITX2 gene.

== Function ==
This gene encodes a member of the RIEG/PITX homeobox family, which is in the bicoid class of homeodomain proteins. This protein acts as a transcription factor and regulates procollagen lysyl hydroxylase gene expression. This protein is involved in the development of the eye, tooth, and abdominal organs. This protein acts as a transcriptional regulator involved in the basal and hormone-regulated activity of prolactin. A similar protein in other vertebrates is involved in the determination of left-right asymmetry during development. Three transcript variants encoding distinct isoforms have been identified for this gene.

Pitx2 is responsible for the establishment of the left-right axis, the asymmetrical development of the heart, lungs, and spleen, twisting of the gut and stomach, as well as the development of the eyes. Once activated Pitx2 will be locally expressed in the left lateral mesoderm, tubular heart, and early gut which leads to the asymmetrical development of organs and looping of the gut. When Pitx2 is deleted, the irregular morphogenesis of organs results on the left hand side. Pitx2 is left-laterally expressed controlling the morphology of the left visceral organs. Expression of Pitx2 is controlled by an intronic enhancer ASE and Nodal. It appears that while Nodal controls cranial expression of Pitx2, ASE controls left – right expression of Pitx2, which leads to the asymmetrical development of the left sided visceral organs, such as the spleen and liver. Collectively, Pitx2 first acts to prevent the apoptosis of the extraocular muscles followed by acting as the myogenic programmer of the extraocular muscle cells. There have also been studies showing different isoforms of the transcription factor: Pitx2a, Pitx2b, and Pitx2c, each with distinct and non-overlapping functions.

Studies have shown that in chick embryos, Pitx2 is a direct regulator of cVg1, a growth factor homologous to mammalian GDF1. cVg1 is a Transforming growth factor beta signal that is expressed posteriorly before the formation of the embryo germ layers. The Pitx2 regulation of cVg1 is essential both during normal embryonic development and during establishment of polarity in twins created by experimental division of a single, original embryo. Pitx2 is shown to be essential for upregulation of cVg1 through the binding of enhancers, and is necessary for the proper expression of cVg1 in the posterior marginal zone. Expression of cVg1 in the PMZ is in turn necessary for the proper development of the primitive streak. Experimental knockouts of the PITX2 gene are associated with the subsequent upregulation of related Pitx1, which is able to partially compensate for the loss of Pitx2. Pitx2's ability to regulate the polarity of the embryo may be responsible for the ability of developing chicks to establish proper polarity in embryos created by cuts performed as late as the blastoderm stage.

Pitx2 plays a role in limb myogenesis. Pitx2 can determine the development and activation of the MyoD gene (the gene responsible for skeletal myogenesis). Studies have shown that expression of Pitx2 happens before MyoD is expressed in muscles. Further studies show that Pitx2 is directly recruited to act on the MyoD core enhancer and thus, directing the expression of the MyoD gene. Pitx 2 is in a parallel pathway with Myf5 and Myf6, as both paths effect expression of MyoD. However, in the absence of the parallel pathway, Pitx2 can continue activating MyoD genes. The expression of Pitx2 saves MyoD gene expression and keeps expressing this gene for limb myogenesis. Yet, the Pitx 2 pathway is PAX3 dependent and requires this gene to enact limb myogenesis. Studies support this finding as in the absence of PAX3, there is Pitx2 expression deficit and thus, MyoD does not express itself in limb myogenesis. The Pitx2 gene is thus shown to be downstream of Pax3 and serve as an intermediate between Pax3 and MyoD. In conclusion, Pitx2 plays an integral role in limb myogenesis.

Pitx2 isoforms are expressed in a sexually dimorphic manner during rat gonadal development.

Pitx2 expression has been shown to be important for normal anterior pituitary gland development. Studies using mice embryos established Pitx2 expression is required in a dosage dependent manner. Mice with a homozygous null mutation of the Pitx2 gene showed that it is not required for initial pituitary formation but is needed for further development. Littermates of normal homozygotes, Pitx2+/+, versus homozygous null, Pitx2-/-, at embryonic day 10.5 provided a comparison of differing pouch sizes and cell types. Mice with the homozygous null gene had a smaller pouch and mesenchymal cell growth and differentiation arrested. While embryos with a hypomorphic mutation, Pitx2neo/+, of the gene were considered morphologically normal. Along with normal pituitary expansion, Pitx2 is needed for normal expression of cell transcription genes of hormones produced in the anterior pituitary. Of which are luteinizing hormone (LH), follicle stimulating hormone (FSH), gonadotropin-releasing hormone (GnRH), growth hormone (GH), and thyroid stimulating hormone (TSH). A study conducted using Pitx2neo/neo mice at postnatal day 1, found the transcripts of hormone genes for LH beta (LHb) and FSH beta (FSHb), and GnRH receptor (GnRHR) were nearly absent or nearly abolished, respectively. While transcription genes for GH and TSH producing cells, and growth hormone releasing hormone receptor (GHRHR) of Pitx2neo homozygous mice were moderately reduced. Further analysis of the transcription factors, Gata2, Egr1 and SF1, involved in LHb and FSHb differentiation found a reduction or absence of them in Pitx2neo/neo mice. The transcription factors, Prop1 and Pit1, which control development of GH and TSH producing cells, were also studied in Pitx2neo homozygous mice but only Pit1 expression was reduced. A reduction or absence of the transcription factors of the gonadotropin cells of the anterior pituitary leads to a loss of full pituitary cell function.

== Clinical significance ==
Mutations in this gene are associated with Axenfeld-Rieger syndrome (ARS), iridogoniodysgenesis syndrome (IGDS), and sporadic cases of Peters anomaly. This protein plays a role in the terminal differentiation of somatotroph and lactotroph cell phenotypes.

Pitx2 is overexpressed in many cancers. For example, thyroid, ovarian, and colon cancer all have higher levels of Pitx2 compared to noncancerous tissues. Scientists speculate that cancer cells improperly turn on Pitx2, leading to uncontrolled cell proliferation. This is consistent with the role of Pitx2 in regulating the growth-regulating genes cyclin D2, cyclin D1, and C-Myc.

In renal cancer, Pitx2 regulates expression of ABCB1, a multidrug transporter, by binding to the promoter region of ABCB1. Increased expression of Pitx2 in renal cancer cells is associated with increased expression of ABCB1. Thus, renal cancer cells that overexpress ABCB1 have a greater resistance to chemotherapeutic agents. In experiments where Pitx2 expression was decreased, renal cancer cells had decreased cell proliferation and greater susceptibility to doxorubicin treatment, which is consistent with other results.

In human esophageal squamous cell carcinoma (ESCC), Pitx2 is overexpressed compared to normal esophageal squamous cells. In addition, greater expression of Pitx2 is positively correlated with clinical aggressiveness of ESCC. Also, ESCC patients with high Pitx2 expression did not respond as well to definitive chemoradiotherapy (CRT) compared to ESCC patients with low Pitx2 expression. Thus, physicians may be able to use Pitx2 expression to predict how ESCC patients will respond to cancer treatment.

In Congenital Heart Disease, heterozygous mutations in Pitx2 have been involved in the development of Tetralogy of Fallot, ventricular septal defects, atrial septal defects, transposition of great arteries, and endocardial cushion defect (ECD). The mutations of the Pitx2 gene are created through alternative splicing. The isoform of Pitx2 important for cardiogenesis is Pitx2c. The lack of expression of this particular isoform correlates with these congenital defects. Pitx2 mutations significantly reduce transcriptional activity of Pitx2 and synergistic activation between Pitx2 and NKX2(also important for development of the heart). The large phenotypic spectrum due to the mutation of Pitx2 may be attributed to a variety of factors including: different genetic backgrounds, epigenetic modifiers and delayed/complete penetrance. The mutation of Pitx2 is not defined as the cause of these congenital heart defects, but currently perceived as a risk factor for their development.

Studies have also shown that Pitx2 displays an oncogenic role that is correlated with patients that have lung adenocarcinoma (LUAD). Pitx2 was overexpressed in LUAD when compared with neighboring normal tissues and is reported to increase clinical stages of the carcinoma and decrease survival. Patients with LUAD that presented with higher levels of Pitx2 had a lower overall survival rate compared to those with lower levels of Pitx2. The Pitx2 gene plays a role in lung adenocarcinoma that is dependent on activating the Wnt/β-catenin signaling pathway. When analyzing experimental findings from this Wnt/β-catenin signaling pathway, a TCGA dataset showed that Pitx2 had a positive correlation with WNT3A. These results propose that Pixt2 is directly bound to the WNT3A promoter region which will enhance WNT3A's transcription. This transcriptional regulation of WNT3A has been reported to encourage migration and the infiltration process of LUAD which can worsen a LUAD patients' prognosis. Experimental knockdown of Pixt2 repressed tumor growth of LUAD; this supports the claim that Pixt2 is associated with the tumorigenesis of cancers, specifically in lung adenocarcinoma. These results suggest that Pitx2 may have a potential to serve as a biomarker for patients that present with LUAD.
