= Dicoria =

Dicoria can mean:

- Dicoria (plant), a genus of flowering plants in the daisy family
- Having two pupils in the same eye: see polycoria
- An old and now wrong usage for heterochromia iridum (having eyes of different colors)
