= Gustavson syndrome =

- Specialty: Medical genetics
- Causes: X-linked recessive inheritance
- Prevention: none
- Prognosis: bad
- Frequency: very rare, only 7 case have been reported
- Deaths: 7

Gustavson syndrome, also known as Severe X-linked intellectual disability, Gustavson type, is a rare genetic disorder characterized by severe intellectual disabilities, microcephaly, developmental delay, optic atrophy-induced severe vision impairment/loss, severe hearing loss, spasticity, epilepsy, hypomobility of major joints, facial dysmorphisms (such as large ears and short nose), and premature death (occurring mainly during infancy or early childhood). Some other frequent symptoms include severe postnatal growth retardation, infantile apnea, brain atrophy, dilation of the fourth cerebral ventricle, recurrent upper respiratory tract infections, and a small fontanelle. This disorder was first discovered in 1993, by Gustavson et al., when they described 7 male children from a 2-generation family, these children had the symptoms mentioned above, and they (Gustavson et al.) came to the conclusion that this case was part of a novel X-linked recessive syndrome. No new cases have been reported since then (1993).
