= KCNT1 =

Protein-coding gene in the species Homo sapiens

Identifiers
- Aliases: KCNT1, EIEE14, ENFL5, KCa4.1, SLACK, bA100C15.2, Slo2.2, potassium sodium-activated channel subfamily T member 1, DEE14
- External IDs: OMIM: 608167; MGI: 1924627; GeneCards: KCNT1

Gene location (Human)
Chr.	Chromosome 9 (human)
Band	9q34.3	Start	135,702,185 bp
Band	9q34.3	End	135,795,508 bp

Gene location (Mouse)
Chr.	Chromosome 2 (mouse)
Band	2|2 A3	Start	25,753,746 bp
Band	2|2 A3	End	25,808,285 bp
RNA expression pattern
Bgee	Human / Mouse (ortholog); Top expressed in: right hemisphere of cerebellum; right frontal lobe; Brodmann area 9; anterior cingulate cortex; gastrocnemius muscle; putamen; muscle of thigh; prefrontal cortex; caudate nucleus; spleen / Top expressed in: cerebellar cortex; superior frontal gyrus; primary visual cortex; lobe of cerebellum; cerebellar vermis; olfactory tubercle; superior colliculus; inferior colliculi; central gray substance of midbrain; lateral septal nucleus; More reference expression data
BioGPS	n/a
Gene ontology
Molecular function	voltage-gated potassium channel activity; potassium channel activity; calcium-activated potassium channel activity; intracellular sodium activated potassium channel activity; outward rectifier potassium channel activity
Cellular component	integral component of membrane; voltage-gated potassium channel complex; plasma membrane; membrane
Biological process	potassium ion transport; ion transport; potassium ion transmembrane transport; regulation of membrane potential
Sources:Amigo / QuickGO
Orthologs
Databases	NCBI: entry; OMA: entry
Species	Human	Mouse
Entrez	57582	227632
Ensembl	ENSG00000107147	ENSMUSG00000058740
UniProt	Q5JUK3	Q6ZPR4
RefSeq (mRNA)	NM_001272003; NM_020822	NM_001145403; NM_175462; NM_001302351
RefSeq (protein)	NP_001258932; NP_065873	NP_001138875; NP_001289280; NP_780671
Location (UCSC)	Chr 9: 135.7 – 135.8 Mb	Chr 2: 25.75 – 25.81 Mb
PubMed search
- Wikidata
View/Edit Human	View/Edit Mouse

Potassium channel subfamily T, member 1, also known as KCNT1 or SLACK, is a human gene that encodes the K_{Ca}4.1 protein. K_{Ca}4.1 is a member of the calcium-activated potassium channel protein family

== Associated Conditions ==
Mutations in the KCNT1 gene has been shown to be a cause of Ohtahara syndrome and other congenital neurodegenerative diseases.

== Therapeutic research ==
Preclinical and translational studies have investigated antisense oligonucleotide knockdown of KCNT1 as a potential therapy for KCNT1-associated developmental and epileptic encephalopathies, including studies in patient-derived neurons and prenatal human neuronal tissue.

== See also ==
- SK channel
- Voltage-gated potassium channel
