= Microdontia =

- Radiograph (X-ray) showing microdontia. Note also periapical lesion on the maxillary left lateral incisor.
- Specialty: Dentistry

Microdontia is a condition in which one or more teeth appear smaller than normal. In the generalized form, all teeth are involved. In the localized form, only a few teeth are involved. The most common teeth affected are the upper lateral incisors and third molars.

Teeth affected by microdontia may also have abnormal shape, and the abnormal size may affect the whole tooth, or only a part of the tooth.

== Definition ==
Males tend to have larger teeth than females, and tooth size also varies by race. Abnormal tooth size is defined by some as when the dimensions are more than 2 standard deviations from the average. Microdontia is when the teeth are abnormally small, and macrodontia is when the teeth are abnormally large.

== Classification ==
There are 3 types of microdontia:

=== True generalized ===
All the teeth are smaller than the normal size. True generalized microdontia is very rare, and occurs in pituitary dwarfism. Due to decreased levels of growth hormone the teeth fail to develop to a normal size.

=== Relative generalized ===
All the teeth are normal size but appear smaller relative to enlarged jaws. Relative generalized microdontia may be the result of inheritance of a large jaw from one parent, and normal sized teeth from the other.

=== Localized (focal) ===
Localized microdontia is also termed focal, or pseudo-microdontia. A single tooth is smaller than normal. Localized microdontia is far more common than generalized microdontia, and is often associated with hypodontia (reduced number of teeth). The most commonly involved tooth in localized microdontia is the maxillary lateral incisor, which may also be shaped like an inverted cone (a "peg lateral"). Peg laterals typically occur on both sides, and have short roots. Inheritance may be involved, and the frequency of microdontia in the upper laterals is just under 1%. The second most commonly involved tooth is the maxillary third molars, and after this supernumerary teeth.

== Causes ==
There are many potential factors involved.

- Congenital hypopituitarism
- Ectodermal dysplasia
- Down syndrome
- Ionizing radiation to the jaws during tooth development (odontogenesis)
- Chemotherapy during tooth development
- Marshall syndrome
- Rieger syndrome
- Focal dermal hypoplasia
- Silver-Russell syndrome
- Williams syndrome
- Gorlin-Chaudhry-Moss syndrome
- Coffin–Siris syndrome
- Salamon syndrome
- Cleft lip and palate

Others include trichorhinopharyngeal, odontotrichomelic, neuroectodermal and dermo-odontodysplasia syndromes.

== Treatment ==
Unerupted microdonts may require surgical removal to prevent the formation of cysts. Erupted microdonts, peg laterals especially, may cause cosmetic concern. Such teeth may be restored to resemble normal sized teeth, typically with composite build ups or crowns. Orthodontics may be required in severe cases to close gaps between the teeth.

== Epidemiology ==
Females are affected more than males, and the condition occurs in permanent (adult) teeth more than deciduous (baby teeth or milk teeth).
