= SPTAN1 =

Protein-coding gene in the species Homo sapiens

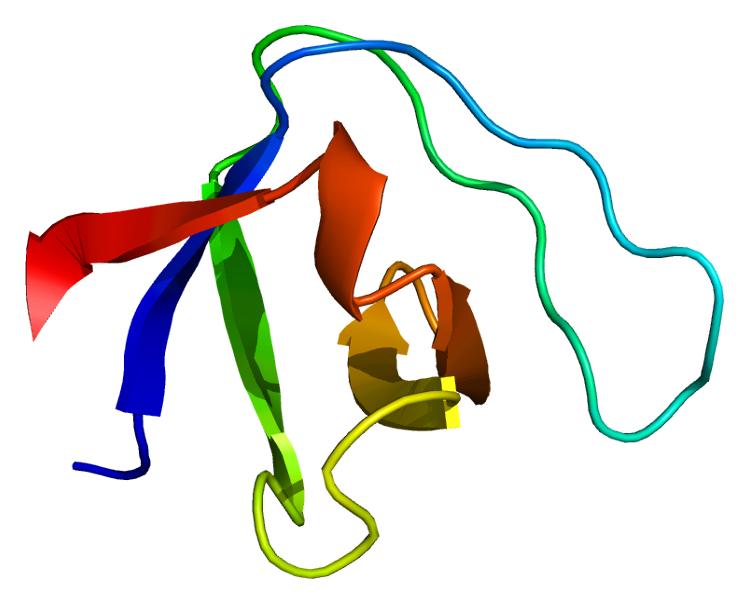

Identifiers
- Aliases: SPTAN1, EIEE5, NEAS, SPTA2, spectrin alpha, non-erythrocytic 1, DEE5
- External IDs: OMIM: 182810; MGI: 98386; GeneCards: SPTAN1
Available structures
PDB	Ortholog search: PDBe RCSB
PDB	List of PDB id codes 2FOT, 3F31, 3FB2

Gene location (Human)
Chr.	Chromosome 9 (human)
Band	9q34.11	Start	128,552,558 bp
Band	9q34.11	End	128,633,662 bp

Gene location (Mouse)
Chr.	Chromosome 2 (mouse)
Band	2 B|2 20.93 cM	Start	29,855,572 bp
Band	2 B|2 20.93 cM	End	29,921,463 bp
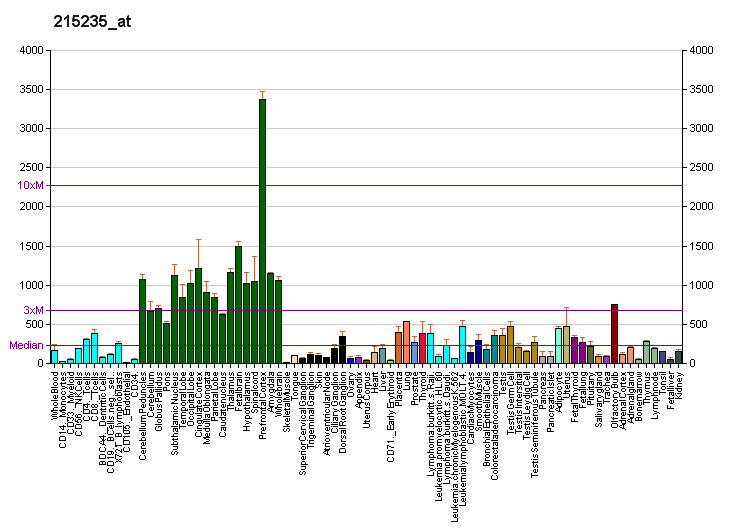

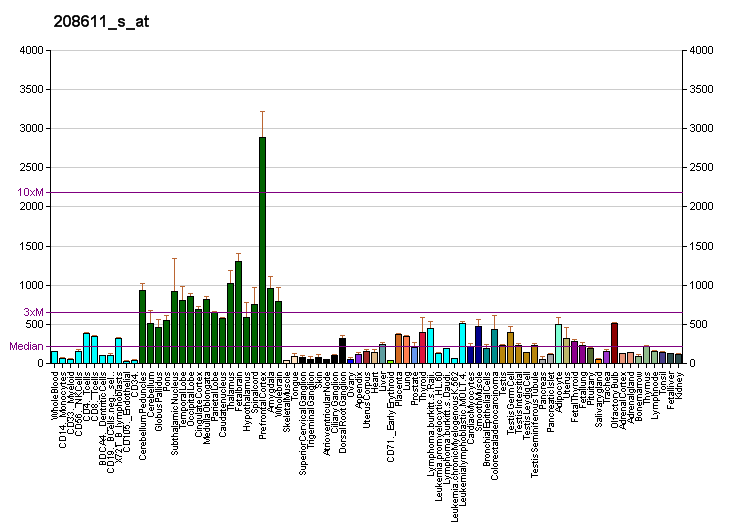
RNA expression pattern
Bgee	Human / Mouse (ortholog); Top expressed in: right hemisphere of cerebellum; right frontal lobe; Brodmann area 9; amygdala; right uterine tube; nucleus accumbens; prefrontal cortex; Brodmann area 10; cingulate gyrus; tibial nerve / Top expressed in: facial motor nucleus; epithelium of lens; dentate gyrus of hippocampal formation granule cell; ciliary body; Rostral migratory stream; cerebellar cortex; iris; anterior horn of spinal cord; barrel cortex; external carotid artery; More reference expression data
BioGPS	More reference expression data
Gene ontology
Molecular function	calcium ion binding; metal ion binding; calmodulin binding; structural constituent of cytoskeleton; protein binding; actin binding; cadherin binding
Cellular component	cytoplasm; extracellular vesicle; cytosol; spectrin; membrane; intracellular membrane-bounded organelle; microtubule cytoskeleton; cell cortex; extracellular exosome; cytoskeleton; extracellular region; specific granule lumen; tertiary granule lumen
Biological process	MAPK cascade; axon guidance; endoplasmic reticulum to Golgi vesicle-mediated transport; actin filament capping; cytoskeleton organization; neutrophil degranulation; regulation of molecular function
Sources:Amigo / QuickGO
Orthologs
Databases	NCBI: entry; OMA: entry
Species	Human	Mouse
Entrez	6709	20740
Ensembl	ENSG00000197694	ENSMUSG00000057738
UniProt	Q13813	P16546
RefSeq (mRNA)	NM_001130438; NM_001195532; NM_003127; NM_001363759; NM_001363765 NM_001375310; NM_001375311; NM_001375312; NM_001375313; NM_001375314; NM_001375318	NM_001076554; NM_001177667; NM_001177668; NM_001309460; NM_001369325
RefSeq (protein)	NP_001123910; NP_001182461; NP_003118; NP_001350688; NP_001350694 NP_001362239; NP_001362240; NP_001362241; NP_001362242; NP_001362243; NP_001362247	NP_001171138; NP_001171139; NP_001296389; NP_001356254
Location (UCSC)	Chr 9: 128.55 – 128.63 Mb	Chr 2: 29.86 – 29.92 Mb
PubMed search
- Wikidata
View/Edit Human	View/Edit Mouse

Alpha II-spectrin, also known as Spectrin alpha chain, brain is a protein that in humans is encoded by the SPTAN1 gene. Alpha II-spectrin is expressed in a variety of tissues, and is highly expressed in cardiac muscle at Z-disc structures, costameres and at the sarcolemma membrane. Mutations in alpha II-spectrin have been associated with early infantile epileptic encephalopathy-5, and alpha II-spectrin may be a valuable biomarker for Guillain–Barré syndrome and infantile congenital heart disease.

== Structure ==
Alternate splicing of alpha II-spectrin has been documented and results in multiple transcript variants; specifically, cardiomyocytes have four identified alpha II-spectrin splice variants. As opposed to alpha I-spectrin that is principally found in erythrocytes, alpha II-spectrin is expressed in most tissues. In cardiac tissue, alpha II-spectrin is found in myocytes at Z-discs, costameres, and the sarcolemma membrane, and in cardiac fibroblasts along the surface of the cytoskeletal network. Alpha II-spectrin most commonly exists in a heterodimer with alpha II and beta II spectrin subunits; and dimers typically self-associate and heterotetramerize.

== Function ==
The spectrins are a family of widely distributed cytoskeletal proteins which are involved in actin crosslinking, cell adhesion, intercellular communication and cell cycle regulation. Though a role in cardiac muscle is not well understood, it is likely that alpha II-spectrin is involved in organizing sub-sarcolemmal domains and stabilizing sarcolemmal membranes against the stresses associated with continuous cardiac contraction. Functional diversity of alpha II-spectrin is manifest through its four splice variants. First, a cardiac-specific, 21 amino acid sequence insert in the 21st spectrin repeat, termed alpha II-cardi+, was identified as an insert that modulates affinity of alpha II-spectrin for binding beta-spectrins and regulates myocyte growth and differentiation. Secondly, another insert of 20 amino acids in the 10th spectrin repeat, termed SH3i+, contains protein kinase A and protein kinase C phosphorylation sites and modulates Ca2+-dependent cleavage of spectrin and protein-protein interaction properties. Thirdly, an insert of five amino acids in the fifteenth spectrin motif bears a highly antigenic epitope resembling an ankyrin-like p53 binding protein binding site. Fourthly, a six amino acid insert in the twenty-first spectrin motif with unknown function has been reported.

Alpha II-spectrin gene expression has been shown to be upregulated in cardiac fibroblasts in response to Angiotensin II-induced cardiac remodeling.

In animal models of disease and injury, alpha II-spectrin has been implicated in diverse functions. In a canine model of hypothermic circulatory arrest, alpha II-spectrin breakdown products have shown to be relevant markers of neurologic injury post-cardiac surgery.

== Clinical significance ==
Mutations in SPTAN1 are the cause of early infantile epileptic encephalopathy-5.

Alpha II-spectrin has shown promising utility as a biomarker for brain necrosis and apoptosis in infants with congenital heart disease; breakdown products of alpha II-spectrin have been detected in the serum of neonates in the perioperative period and following open-heart surgery. Elevated protein expression of alpha II-spectrin has been detected in cerebrospinal fluid in patients with Guillain–Barré syndrome.

== Interactions ==
SPTAN1 has been shown to interact with:

- Abl gene,
- FANCA,
- Fanconi anemia, complementation group C,
- GRIA2,
- Plectin,
- SHANK1, and
- Vimentin.

== See also ==
- Sjögren's syndrome
