= Forkhead box C1 =

Protein-coding gene in the species Homo sapiens

FOXC1

Identifiers
- Aliases: FOXC1, ARA, FKHL7, FREAC-3, FREAC3, IGDA, IHG1, IRID1, RIEG3, forkhead box C1, ASGD3
- External IDs: OMIM: 601090; MGI: 1347466; GeneCards: FOXC1

Gene location (Human)
Chr.	Chromosome 6 (human)
Band	6p25.3	Start	1,609,915 bp
Band	6p25.3	End	1,613,897 bp

Gene location (Mouse)
Chr.	Chromosome 13 (mouse)
Band	13 A3.2|13 13.52 cM	Start	31,990,616 bp
Band	13 A3.2|13 13.52 cM	End	31,996,459 bp
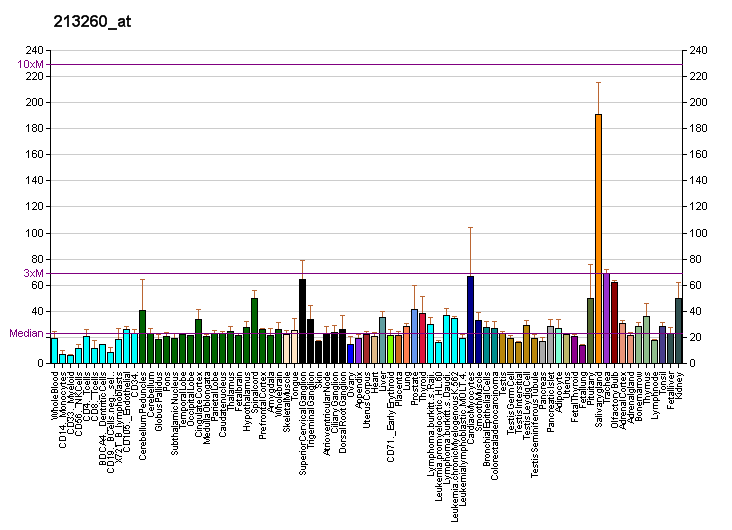
RNA expression pattern
Bgee	Human / Mouse (ortholog); Top expressed in: parotid gland; vena cava; trigeminal ganglion; renal medulla; palpebral conjunctiva; tibia; endothelial cell; cartilage tissue; nipple; urethra / Top expressed in: parotid gland; lacrimal gland; stria vascularis; interatrial septum; calvaria; ascending aorta; paraxial mesoderm; conjunctival fornix; pulmonary valve; septum primum; More reference expression data
BioGPS	More reference expression data
Gene ontology
Molecular function	DNA binding; sequence-specific DNA binding; RNA polymerase II transcription regulatory region sequence-specific DNA binding; DNA-binding transcription activator activity, RNA polymerase II-specific; protein binding; transcription factor activity, RNA polymerase II distal enhancer sequence-specific binding; DNA binding, bending; transcription coactivator binding; transcription coactivator activity; transcription factor binding; promoter-specific chromatin binding; DNA-binding transcription factor activity; DNA-binding transcription factor activity, RNA polymerase II-specific
Cellular component	nucleoplasm; nucleus; cytosol
Biological process	eye development; somitogenesis; Notch signaling pathway; skeletal system development; glycosaminoglycan metabolic process; positive regulation of hematopoietic progenitor cell differentiation; regulation of transcription, DNA-templated; neural crest cell development; paraxial mesoderm formation; ossification; vascular endothelial growth factor signaling pathway; collagen fibril organization; maintenance of lens transparency; heart morphogenesis; in utero embryonic development; cardiac muscle cell proliferation; lymph vessel development; transcription, DNA-templated; embryonic heart tube development; positive regulation of hematopoietic stem cell differentiation; odontogenesis of dentin-containing tooth; positive regulation of transcription, DNA-templated; ventricular cardiac muscle tissue morphogenesis; development of the heart; blood vessel remodeling; brain development; vascular endothelial growth factor receptor signaling pathway; negative regulation of lymphangiogenesis; blood vessel development; positive regulation of gene expression; mesenchymal cell differentiation; mesenchymal cell development; artery morphogenesis; ovarian follicle development; negative regulation of angiogenesis; camera-type eye development; regulation of organ growth; germ cell migration; lacrimal gland development; negative regulation of mitotic cell cycle; negative regulation of apoptotic process involved in outflow tract morphogenesis; transcription by RNA polymerase II; endochondral ossification; cell population proliferation; positive regulation of epithelial to mesenchymal transition; cell migration; positive regulation of DNA binding; positive regulation of transcription by RNA polymerase II; cellular response to epidermal growth factor stimulus; positive regulation of core promoter binding; negative regulation of transcription by RNA polymerase II; cerebellum development; positive regulation of keratinocyte differentiation; glomerular epithelium development; ureteric bud development; kidney development; chemokine-mediated signaling pathway; cellular response to chemokine; angiogenesis; multicellular organism development; regulation of transcription by RNA polymerase II; anatomical structure morphogenesis; cell differentiation
Sources:Amigo / QuickGO
Orthologs
Databases	NCBI: entry; OMA: entry
Species	Human	Mouse
Entrez	2296	17300
Ensembl	ENSG00000054598	ENSMUSG00000050295
UniProt	Q12948	Q61572
RefSeq (mRNA)	NM_001453	NM_008592
RefSeq (protein)	NP_001444	NP_032618
Location (UCSC)	Chr 6: 1.61 – 1.61 Mb	Chr 13: 31.99 – 32 Mb
PubMed search
- Wikidata
View/Edit Human	View/Edit Mouse

Forkhead box C1, also known as FOXC1, is a protein which in humans is encoded by the FOXC1 gene.

== Function ==
This gene belongs to the forkhead family of transcription factors which is characterized by a distinct DNA-binding fork head domain. The specific function of this gene has not yet been determined; however, it has been shown to play a role in the regulation of embryonic and ocular development.

== Heart development and somitogenesis ==
FOXC1 and its close relative, FOXC2 are both critical components in the development of the heart and blood vessels, as well as the segmentation of the paraxial mesoderm and the formation of somites. Expression of the Fox proteins range from low levels in the posterior pre-somitic mesoderm (PSM) to the highest levels in the anterior PSM. Homozygous mutant embryos for both Fox proteins failed to form somites 1–8, which indicates the importance of these proteins early on in somite development.

In cardiac morphogenesis, FOXC1 and FOXC2 are required for the proper development of the cardiac outflow tract. The outflow tract forms from a cell population known as the secondary heart field. The Fox proteins are transcribed in the secondary heart field where they regulate the expression of key signaling molecules such as Fgf8, Fgf10, Tbx1, Isl1, and Bmp4.

== Clinical significance ==
Mutations in this gene cause various glaucoma phenotypes including primary congenital glaucoma, autosomal dominant iridogoniodysgenesis anomaly, and Axenfeld–Rieger syndrome type 3. FOXC1 mutations are also found in association with Dandy–Walker malformation.

== Role in cancer ==
FOXC1 induces the epithelial to mesenchymal transition (EMT), which is a process where epithelial cells separate from surrounding cells and begin migration. This process is involved in metastasis, giving FOXC1 a crucial role in cancer. The over expression of FOXC1 results in the up-regulation of fibronectin, vimentin, and N-cadherin, which contribute to cellular migration in nasopharyngeal carcinoma (NPC). The knockout of FOXC1 in human NPC cells down-regulated vimentin, fibronectin, and N-cadherin expression.

FOXC1 transcription factor regulates EMT in basal-like breast cancer (BLBC). Activation of SMO-independent Hedgehog signaling by FOXC1 alters the cancer stem cell (CSC) properties in BLBC cells. These CSCs, which are regulated by FOXC1 signaling, contribute to tumor proliferation, tissue invasion, and relapse.

== See also ==
- FOX proteins
