= Periodic short-interval diffuse discharges =

Periodic short-interval diffuse discharges are a type of EEG abnormality with periodicity less than 4.0 seconds. They can consist of sharp waves or spikes, spike and wave, polyspikes or triphasics with background attenuation in between transients.
