= Iridodialysis =

- Other names: Coredialysis
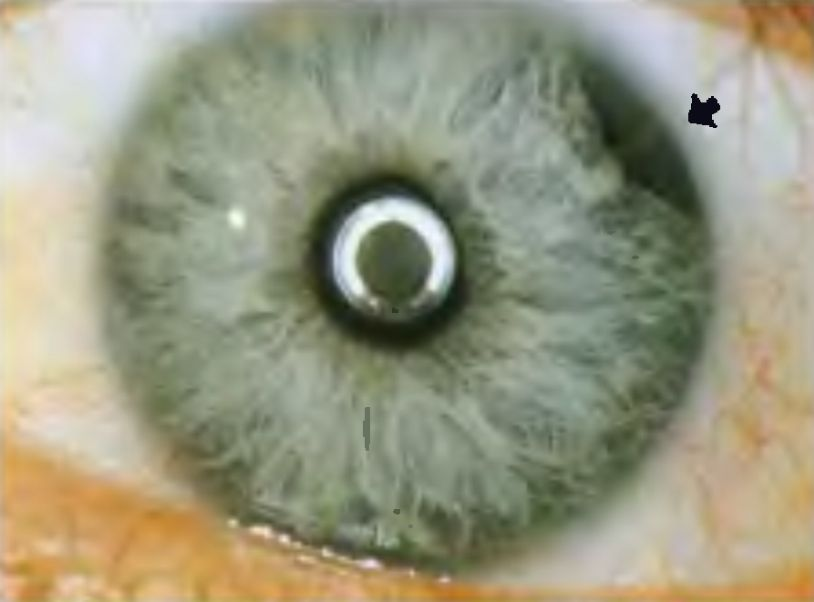
- Iridodialysis caused by blunt trauma to the eye
- Specialty: Ophthalmology

Iridodialysis is a localized separation or tearing away of the iris from its attachment to the ciliary body.

== Symptoms and signs ==
Those with small iridodialyses may be asymptomatic and require no treatment, but those with larger dialyses may have corectopia or polycoria and experience monocular diplopia, glare, or photophobia. Iridodialyses often accompany angle recession and may cause glaucoma or hyphema. Hypotony may also occur.

=== Complications ===
Those with traumatic iridodialyses (particularly by blunt trauma) are at high risk for angle recession, which may cause glaucoma. This is typically seen about 100 days after the injury, and as such is sometimes called "100-day glaucoma". Medical or surgical treatment to control the IOP may be required if glaucoma is present. Soft, opaque contact lenses may be used to improve cosmesis and reduce the perception of double vision.

== Causes ==
Iridodialyses are usually caused by blunt trauma to the eye, but may also be caused by penetrating eye injuries. An iridodialysis may be an iatrogenic complication of any intraocular surgery and at one time they were created intentionally as part of intracapsular cataract extraction. Iridodialyses have been reported to have occurred from boxing, airbag deployments, high-pressure water jets, elastic bungee cords, bottle caps opened under pressure, water balloons, fireworks, and various types of balls.

== Treatment ==
Iridodialysis causing an associated hyphema has to be carefully managed, and recurrent bleeds should be prevented by strict avoidance of all sporting activities. Management typically involves observation and bed rest. Red blood cells may decrease the outflow of aqueous humor, therefore the eye pressure should be kept low by giving oral acetazolamide (a diuretic given to reduce intraocular pressure). Accidental trauma during sleep should be prevented by patching with an eye shield during night time. Avoid giving aspirin, heparin/warfarin and observe daily for resolution or progression. A large hyphema may require careful anterior chamber washout. Rebleeds may require additional intervention and therapy.

Later, surgical repair may be considered for larger avulsions causing significant double vision, cosmesis or glare symptoms. Surgical repair is usually done by 10-0 prolene suture taking the base of iris avulsion and suturing it to the scleral spur and ciliary body junction.

== See also ==
- Eye injury
