= Iridogoniodysgenesis, dominant type =

- Iridogoniodysgenesis, dominant type is inherited via autosomal dominant manner

Iridogoniodysgenesis, dominant type (type 1, IRID1) refers to a spectrum of diseases characterized by malformations of the irido-corneal angle of the anterior chamber of the eye. Iridogoniodysgenesis is the result of abnormal migration or terminal induction of neural crest cells. These cells lead to formation of most of the anterior segment structures of the eye (corneal stroma & endothelium, iris stroma, trabeculum).

== Symptoms and signs ==
Symptoms include iris hypoplasis, goniodysgenesis, and juvenile glaucoma. Glaucoma phenotype that maps to 6p25 results from mutations in the forkhead transcription factor gene FOXC1

== Cause ==
This is transmitted through an autosomal dominant pattern with complete penetrance and variable expressivity.

== Treatment ==
Treatment of glaucoma in iridogoniodysgenesis is primarily surgical.

It is listed as a "rare disease" by the Office of Rare Diseases (ORD). This means that Iridogoniodysgenesis, dominant type, or a subtype of Iridogoniodysgenesis, dominant type, affects less than 200,000 people in the US population.

== History ==
This was first reported by Berg (1932).
