= Ichthyosis-intellectual disability-dwarfism-renal impairment =

Genetic disorder

- Other names: Icthyosis-intellectual deficit-dwarfism-renal impairment, Ichthyosis-mental retardation-dwarfism-renal impairment, Passwell-Goodman-Siprkowski syndrome
- Specialty: Medical genetics
- Symptoms: ichthyosis from birth, intellectual disabilities, abnormally short stature, and renal impairments
- Usual onset: Birth
- Duration: Life-long
- Causes: Autosomal recessive genetic mutation
- Differential diagnosis: ichthyosis vulgaris, isolated intellectual disability, kidney dysplasia, idiopathic short stature
- Frequency: < 1 in 1,000,000, (only 4 cases described)

Ichthyosis-intellectual disability-dwarfism-renal impairment is a very rare autosomal recessive ichthyotic genetic disorder which consists of congenital ichthyosis, intellectual disabilities, dwarfism/short stature and renal impairment. This condition has a prevalence of fewer than 1 in 1,000,000 people. First described in 1975, it has only been reported in four members of an Iranian family.
