= United States Eye Injury Registry =

The United States Eye Injury Registry is an American national database of eye injuries.
