= Polycoria =

Pathological condition of the eye

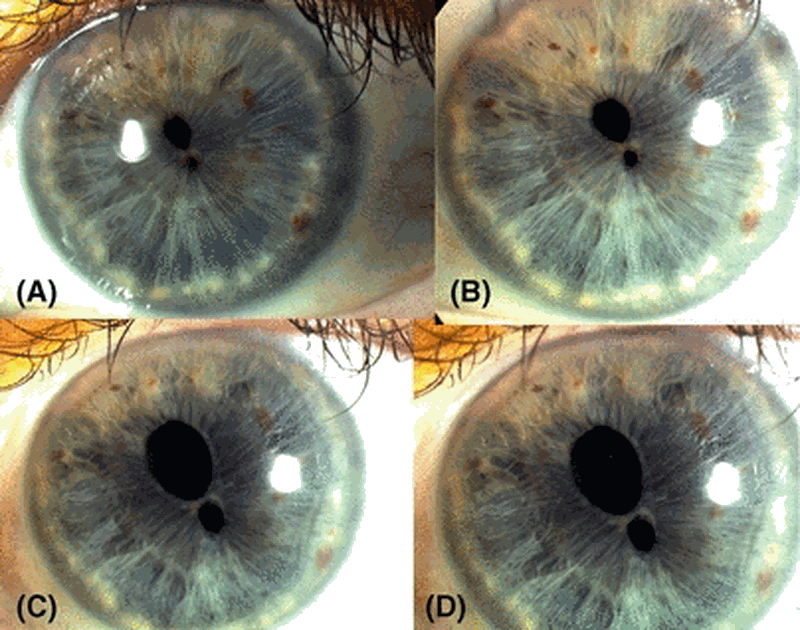
Eye imaging showing polycoria in four different levels of light.

Polycoria is a pathological condition of the eye distinguished by more than one pupillary opening in the iris. It may be congenital or result from a disease affecting the iris. It results in decreased function of the iris and pupil, affecting the physical eye and visualization.

In the early history of China, double pupils were seen as a sign that a child would become a great king or sage.

== True polycoria ==
In cases of true polycoria, there is an extra pupil that tends to be reactive to light and medication. To be considered true polycoria, the extra pupil and the principal pupil must dilate, and contract simultaneously with triggers such as light, and administered drugs. The extraneous pupil is c. 2.5mm away from the principal pupil. In cases of true polycoria, there is an intact sphincter muscle, which contracts and dilates the pupils. In an eye without polycoria, the sphincter muscle is a part of the iris that functions to constrict and dilate the pupil. A patient with true polycoria experiences handicapped vision as well as stimulation of the retina in response to bright lights.

It is said that the term "true polycoria" is overused, and used correctly when addressing congenital deformations of the iris. Often "true polycoria" is used when it in fact is a case of pseudopolycoria.

== Pseudopolycoria ==
Although less rare than true polycoria, pseudopolycoria is still very uncommon. In cases of pseudopolycoria there is a "passive constriction" that differentiates the extra pupil from the true pupil during constriction and dilation. The extra pupil in pseudopolycoria is different than the extra pupil in true polycoria because it shows defects that are independent of the sphincter muscles. Pseudopolycoria is often associated with Seckel syndrome, posterior polymorphous dystrophy, and juvenile glaucoma. Pseudopolycoria consists of splitting of the iris that are not contingent with the sphincter muscles at the root of the iris.

== Symptoms and signs ==
The signs and symptoms shown in a patient diagnosed with polycoria are associated with ocular and adnexal growth abnormalities. The iris and the pupil become less effective. Signs can be present as a child; however, the patient may be diagnosed later in their life. This condition results in abnormal eye development affecting both eyes or just one.

== Causes ==
There are not any known direct mechanisms involved in the development of true polycoria or pseudopolycoria. There are some proposed ideas, one being that after the sphincter muscle is fully formed and developed in the eye there is a severing of the pupillary margins leading to the distinction of the extra pupil and the principal pupil. Polycoria can also be caused any hole in one's iris to develop a sphincter muscle development. Another proposed theory about the cause of polycoria is intrauterine trauma, or postpartum iris trauma. If the development of the iris is hindered, the ectoderm of the eye (which forms the lens and corneal epithelium) may split, which could lead to pseudopolycoria.

== Genetics ==
The gene that is the cause of this disorder is the PRDM5 gene. The PRDM5 gene has also been linked to Brittle Cornea syndrome, which is a tissue disorder of the eye, as well as Axenfeld syndrome. PRDM5 plays crucial roles in the molecular composition of the eye, as well as the tissue thickness. Axenfeld syndrome occurs in the patient in a case of the mutation of the FOXC1 gene, which is a heterozygous mutation.

== Diagnosis ==
Upon gross examination the patient will typically have excessively long eyelashes. The iris becomes hypoplastic, making abnormally shaped pupils with prominent crypts. The crypts are little squiggly lines that radiate out around the pupil; with this condition, thick round or oval openings can be seen. On diagnosis, signs lead to symptoms where there is more than one set of iris muscles, which controls the amount of light being brought into the eye. When the iris becomes deformed, it will disarrange the control of light coming in leading to blurred vision and finding it hard to visually focus. Polar cataracts will also be present in this condition where a round, opaque malformation of distorted lens fibers is located in the central posterior part of the lens showing deformity.

== Prevention ==
There are no known preventive measures for polycoria, however genetic testing may be able to reveal genetic patterns of the disorder. Conditions such as reduced corneal thickness, are observed in people with cases of polycoria, as well as keratoconus (keratoconus is a corneal disease has the possibility of leading to astigmatism or blindness). However, there are some proposals that it is caused by a dissociation of the pupil margins, a partial coloboma which is a hole in the eye, or abnormal eye tissue composition.

== Treatment ==
Polycoria has been linked to hereditary genetics, and also associated with polar cataracts, glaucoma, and retinal detachment. Not all cases are treated for this iris abnormality, but when cases are treated the only treatment is surgical procedure and life-long ocular monitoring that is highly recommended. Considerations for surgery are surgical correction, intraocular surgery, or reapproximation, as if it was being treated for glaucoma or retinal detachment. Children under the age of 3, who do not seek surgery, have responded well with miotic drops that contained mydriatic/cycloplegic, allowing the separate eye sphincters to dilate and constrict together. This allows improved balance of uncorrected visual acuity. A 1-mm limbal incisions would be made, a spatula is inserted through the side to elevate the two pupils (avoiding contact with the lens), and the iris tissue would be cut using viscoelastic material. Finally, the limbal incisions were closed with stromal hydration, and intracameral cefuroxime is applied.

=== Surgical technique ===
There have been cases where there are various techniques for surgical procedures and can be performed on children and adults. One of the techniques for repair is by using a double armed polypropylene suture, where the suture is left externally on the sclera with a knot buried in the scleral flap. This technique allows posterior fixation of intraocular lens implants in the absence of capsular support. Another technique for surgery is called pupilloplasty, where the patient would be placed under retrobulbar anesthesia with the pupils being dilated with 1% tropicamide.

== Prognosis ==
=== Postoperative care ===
Hypertonic saline solution used as eye drops may be used to reduce the corneal edema, the use of anti-glaucomatous topicals to help improve corneal edema, and aqueous suppressants that are accompanied by miotics, include topical beta blockers, alpha antagonists, and carbonic anhydrase inhibitors. Antibiotics and steroid drops for 4 weeks post surgery.

=== Complications and benefits ===
Complications of surgical procedures are:

- Possible suture erosion through the sclera, conjunctiva, or both.
- Minor intraocular inflammation during and after surgery.
- Improved distant and near visual acuity, little defects surrounding sphincter muscles, and normal pupillary margins.

== History ==
Since true polycoria and pseudopolycoria are so rare, there is not much history on the disorders in the tradition of modern western medicine. According to an article published in 2002, there have only been 2 cases of true polycoria since 1966. Early Chinese history names multiple legendary figures as having double pupils, which as a result led to a belief that a child born with two double pupils was destined to be a great king or sage. Xiang Yu, Hegemon of Chu, blood brother and later arch nemesis of Liu Bang, the founding emperor of the Han dynasty, was given great esteem due to his prowess in combat and auspicious double pupil. After overthrowing the Qin dynasty together, he was named Hegemon of the loose series of kingdoms he created in its wake, while he gave Liu Bang the remote province of Han. The Civil War that followed called the Chu-Han contention, ending with a Han victory and a legendary last stand by the Hegemon.

Pliny the Elder describes a mythological race of people known as Bythiæ who "have a double pupil in one eye, and in the other the figure of a horse."

== See also ==
- Eye injury
- Iridodialysis
- Monocular diplopia
- Coloboma
