= Carotid agenesis =

Vascular anomaly in medicine

Carotid agenesis is a vascular anomaly in which the carotid artery, normally present in the neck, does not develop during embryogenesis. The common carotid artery splits into the external carotid artery and internal carotid artery, with the internal carotid artery supplying blood flow to areas of the brain. Carotid agenesis can involve either the right carotid artery, left carotid artery, or both. Fewer than 1,000 people in the U.S. have been diagnosed with this disease and it is often found incidentally on imaging.

== Symptoms and diagnosis ==
Patients can be asymptomatic, but symptoms include neurological symptoms such as headaches, dizziness, blurred vision, seizures, muscle weakness, or paralysis of cranial nerves. Those with carotid agenesis are also at an increased risk of aneurysms. Diagnosis is typically made through imaging studies such as magnetic resonance angiography (MRA) or computed tomography angiography (CTA). These tests can visualize the absence of the carotid artery and the compensatory blood flow through other vessels. An important distinction seen on imaging between carotid agenesis and carotid hypoplasia is the complete absence of the carotid canal in carotid agenesis. Additional imaging studies may be necessary to evaluate the extent of the anomaly and the presence of any other associated abnormalities.

== Treatment ==
Currently, there are no specific treatment options for carotid agenesis. This is primarily because carotid agenesis may be an incidental finding in a patient that is asymptomatic due to collateral blood flow that develops through the vertebrobasilar system. Treatment is therefore focused on managing the neurological symptoms of the disease, including medications to treat blood pressure, cholesterol, or blood thinners to prevent the formation of blood clots. Additionally, treatment can address improving flow through collateral pathways through vascular reconstruction surgery or stenting.
