= Infantile spasms-broad thumbs syndrome =

- Other names: Tsao-Ellingson syndrome
- Specialty: Medical genetics
- Causes: Autosomal recessive inheritance
- Prevention: none
- Prognosis: Bad
- Frequency: very rare, only 2 cases have been reported.
- Deaths: at least one.

Infantile spasms-broad thumbs syndrome, also known as Tsao Ellingson syndrome, is a very rare and deadly hereditary disorder which is characterized by severe developmental delays, microcephaly, large anterior fontanel, hypertelorism, down-slanting eyes, beaked nose, micrognathia, broad thumbs and big toes, and flexion/extension spasms. Additional features include agenesis of the corpus callosum, bilateral cataracts, hypertrophic cardiomyopathy, mild brain wasting, ventriculomegaly, and hydrocele.

It was first discovered in April 1990, when Chang Y Tsao and Robert J Ellingson described two brothers born to first cousin parents, the first-born baby had all of the symptoms mentioned above (including the additional ones), he was treated with valproate and lorazepam until he died when he was nearly 2 years old (20 months old), the second-born baby was born when he was 36 weeks (gestation) old, and he presented (almost) the same symptoms mentioned above, when he was 6 months old, he started developing mixed flexion and extension spasms. They concluded that this was part of a brand new, autosomal recessive syndrome.
