= BRAT1 =

Protein-coding gene in the species Homo sapiens

Available structures
PDB	Ortholog search: PDBe RCSB
PDB	List of PDB id codes 4IFI

Identifiers
- Aliases: BRAT1, BAAT1, C7orf27, RMFSL, BRCA1 associated ATM activator 1, NEDCAS
- External IDs: OMIM: 614506; MGI: 1891679; HomoloGene: 16776; GeneCards: BRAT1; OMA:BRAT1 - orthologs

Gene location (Human)
Chr.	Chromosome 7 (human)
Band	7p22.3	Start	2,537,810 bp
Band	7p22.3	End	2,555,694 bp

Gene location (Mouse)
Chr.	Chromosome 5 (mouse)
Band	5|5 G2	Start	140,690,766 bp
Band	5|5 G2	End	140,705,134 bp
RNA expression pattern
Bgee	Human / Mouse (ortholog); Top expressed in: left adrenal cortex; granulocyte; right adrenal gland; right adrenal cortex; right testis; left testis; gonad; right hemisphere of cerebellum; right uterine tube; right ovary / Top expressed in: interventricular septum; granulocyte; Rostral migratory stream; spermatocyte; lumbar spinal ganglion; right kidney; ascending aorta; endocardial cushion; external carotid artery; proximal tubule; More reference expression data
BioGPS	n/a
Gene ontology
Molecular function	protein binding
Cellular component	cytoplasm; membrane; nucleus; nucleoplasm
Biological process	mitochondrion localization; response to ionizing radiation; cell growth; positive regulation of protein phosphorylation; cell population proliferation; cell migration; glucose metabolic process; cellular response to DNA damage stimulus; apoptotic process; positive regulation of cell growth
Sources:Amigo / QuickGO
Orthologs
Species	Human	Mouse
Entrez	221927	231841
Ensembl	ENSG00000106009	ENSMUSG00000000148
UniProt	Q6PJG6	Q8C3R1
RefSeq (mRNA)	NM_152743; NM_001350626; NM_001350627	NM_001276287; NM_172724; NM_181066
RefSeq (protein)	NP_689956; NP_001337555; NP_001337556	NP_001263216; NP_851411
Location (UCSC)	Chr 7: 2.54 – 2.56 Mb	Chr 5: 140.69 – 140.71 Mb
PubMed search
- Wikidata
View/Edit Human	View/Edit Mouse

BRCA1-associated ATM activator 1 is a protein in humans that is encoded by the BRAT1 gene.

== Function ==
The protein encoded by this ubiquitously expressed gene interacts with the tumor suppressing BRCA1 (breast cancer 1) protein and the ATM (ataxia telangiectasia mutated) protein. ATM is thought to be a master controller of cell cycle checkpoint signalling pathways that are required for cellular responses to DNA damage such as double-strand breaks that are induced by ionizing radiation and complexes with BRCA1 in the multi-protein complex BASC (BRCA1-associated genome surveillance complex). The protein encoded by this gene is thought to play a role in the DNA damage pathway regulated by BRCA1 and ATM.
