= Eye injury =

Physical or chemical injuries of the eye

- A small piece of iron has lodged in the margin of the cornea
- Specialty: Ophthalmology, neurology

Physical or chemical injuries of the eye can be a serious threat to vision if not treated appropriately and in a timely fashion. The most obvious presentation of ocular (eye) injuries is redness and pain of the affected eyes. This is not, however, universally true, as tiny metallic projectiles may cause neither symptom. Tiny metallic projectiles should be suspected when a patient reports metal on metal contact, such as with hammering a metal surface. Corneal foreign bodies are one of the most common preventable occupational hazards. Intraocular foreign bodies do not cause pain because of the lack of nerve endings in the vitreous humour and retina that can transmit pain sensations. As such, general or emergency department doctors should refer cases involving the posterior segment of the eye or intraocular foreign bodies to an ophthalmologist. Ideally, ointment would not be used when referring to an ophthalmologist, since it diminishes the ability to carry out a thorough eye examination.

Flicking sand, flying pieces of wood, metal, glass and stone are notorious for causing much of the eye trauma. Sporting balls such as cricket ball, lawn tennis ball, squash ball, shuttlecock, and other high speed flying objects can strike the eye. The eye is also susceptible to blunt trauma in a fistfight. Children's games such as bow-and-arrows, bb guns and firecrackers can lead to eye trauma. Road traffic accidents (RTAs) with head and facial trauma may also have an eye injury – these are usually severe in nature with multiple lacerations, shards of glasses embedded in tissues, orbital fractures, severe hematoma and penetrating open-globe injuries with prolapse of eye contents. Other causes of intraocular trauma may arise from workplace tools or even common household implements, including bottle-caps suddenly propelling at great force.

About 5.3 million cases of foreign bodies in the eyes occurred in 2013.

== Presentation ==
=== Complications ===
Multiple complications are known to occur following eye injury: corneal scarring, hyphema, iridodialysis, post-traumatic glaucoma, uveitis cataract, vitreous hemorrhage and retinal detachment. The complications risk is high with retinal tears, penetrating injuries and severe blunt trauma.

== Diagnosis ==
The goal of investigation is the assessment of the severity of the ocular injury with an eye to implementing a management plan as soon as is required. The usual eye examination should be attempted, and may require a topical anesthetic in order to be tolerable. Many topical agents cause burning upon instillation. Proxymetacaine has been found to have the best tolerance.

Depending on the medical history and preliminary examination, the primary care physician should designate the eye injury as a true emergency, urgent or semi-urgent.

=== Classification ===
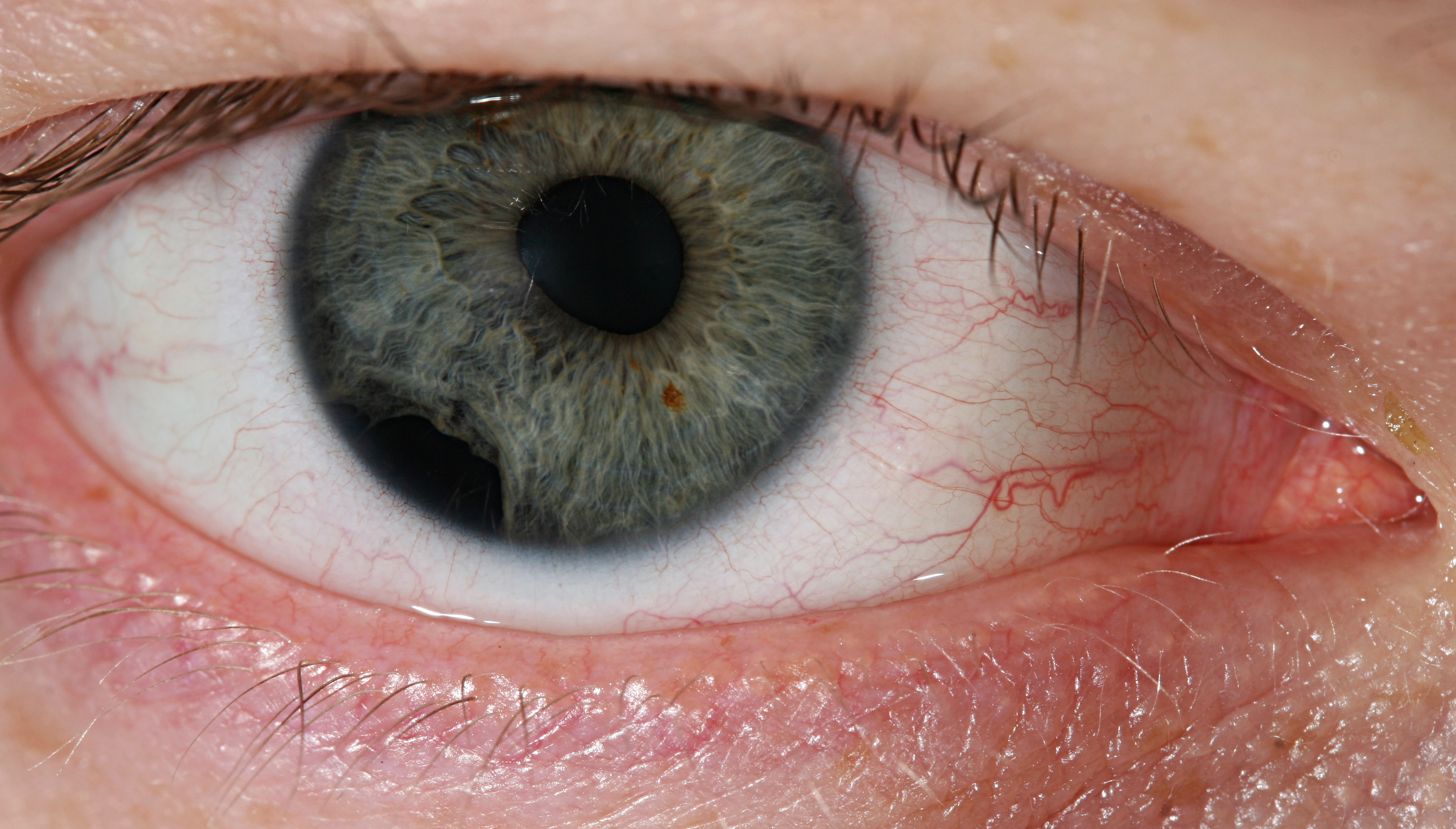
Eye injury by impact of small plastic body

Based on the injury to the eyewall (outer fibrous coat of the eye consisting of cornea and sclera)

- Closed globe injury: the eye globe is intact, but the seven rings of the eye have been classically described as affected by blunt trauma. Types include contusion and lamellar laceration
- Open globe injury: there is a full thickness injury of the eye wall (cornea and sclera)

It includes

A) Globe rupture: caused by blunt trauma and is an inside-out injury.

B) Globe laceration: a full-thickness wound caused by sharp objects. It includes

1)Penetrating trauma: the globe integrity is disrupted by a full-thickness entry wound and may be associated with prolapse of the internal contents of the eye. Such injuries are often referred to as a Globe fracture or a Globe rupture, although these can be incurred by blunt trauma as well.

2) Perforating trauma: the globe integrity is disrupted in two places due to an entrance and exit wound (through and through injury). This is a quite severe type of eye injury.

Other types include

- Blowout fracture of the orbit is caused by blunt trauma, classically described for fist or ball injury, leading to fracture of the floor or medial wall of the orbit due to sudden increased pressure on the orbital contents.
- Muscular Entrapment Fracture of the orbital bones can lead to muscular entrapment limiting gaze in one direction.

=== Emergency ===
An emergency must be treated within minutes. This includes chemical burns of both the conjunctiva and cornea.

=== Urgent ===
An urgent case must be treated within hours. This includes penetrating globe injuries; corneal abrasions or corneal foreign bodies; hyphema (must be referred); eyelid lacerations that are deep, involve the lid margin or involve the lacrimal canaliculi; radiant energy burns such as arc eye (welder's burn) or snow blindness; or, rarely, traumatic optic neuropathy.

=== Semi-urgent ===
Semi-urgent cases must be managed within 1–2 days. They include orbital fractures and subconjunctival hemorrhages.

== Management ==
=== Irrigation ===
The first line of management for chemical injuries is usually copious irrigation of the eye with an isotonic saline or sterile water. In the cases of chemical burns, one should not try to buffer the solution, but instead dilute it with copious flushing.

=== Patching ===
Depending on the type of ocular injury, either a pressure patch or shield patch should be applied. Up until circa 1987, pressure patches were the preferred method of treatment for corneal abrasions in non-contact lens wearers; multiple controlled studies conducted by accredited organizations such as the American Academy of Ophthalmology have shown that pressure patching is of little or no value in healing corneal abrasions and is actually detrimental to healing in some cases. A Cochrane review found that patching simple corneal abrasions may not improve healing or reduce pain. Pressure patching should never be used on an individual presenting with a corneal abrasion who has a history of contact lens wear. In this circumstance, a virulent infection caused by the bacterium Pseudomonas aeruginosa is at a clearly delineated increased risk for occurrence. These infections can cause blindness within 24 – 48 hours and there is a possibility that the infection can move into the peri-orbital socket, resulting in the need for evisceration of the eyeball. In rare cases, the infection can enter the brain and cause death to the patient.

In cases of globe penetration, pressure patches should never be applied, and instead a shield patch should be applied that protects the eye without applying any pressure. If a shield patch is applied to one eye, the other eye should also be patched due to eye movement. If the uninjured eye moves, the injured eye will also move involuntarily possibly causing more damage.

=== Suturing ===
In cases of eyelid laceration, sutures may be a part of appropriate management by the primary care physician so long as the laceration does not threaten the canaliculi, is not deep, and does not affect the lid margins.

== Epidemiology ==
A recent study estimated that from 2002–2003 there were 27,152 injuries in the United States related to the wearing of eyeglasses. The same study concluded that sports-related injuries due to eyeglasses wear were more common in those under the age of 18 and that fall-related injuries due to wearing eyeglasses were more common in those aged 65 and over. Although eyeglasses-related injuries do occur, prescription eyeglasses and non-prescription sunglasses have been found to "offer measurable protection which results in a lower incidence of severe eye injuries to those wearing [them]".

== See also ==
- Black eye
- Chemical eye injury
- United States Eye Injury Registry
- Wilderness medical emergencies
