= Iris hypoplasia with glaucoma =

- Other names: Iris hypoplasia and glaucoma, IHG
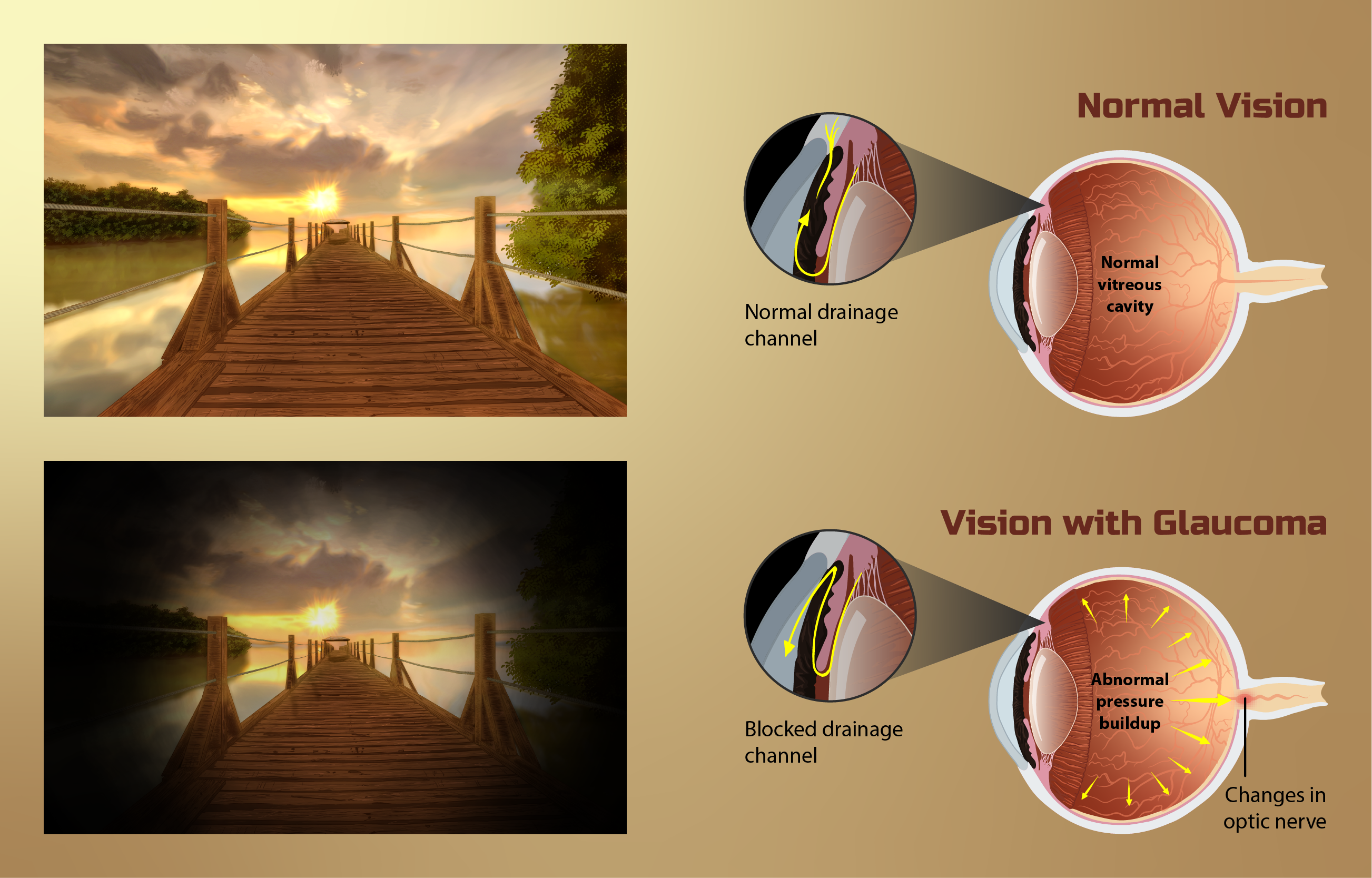
- Specialty: Medical genetics, Ophthalmology
- Symptoms: ocular anomalies
- Usual onset: Conception
- Duration: Lifelong
- Causes: Genetic mutation
- Prevention: None
- Prognosis: Medium
- Frequency: Rare, although 3 families have been described, there could be more, since iris hypoplasia and accompanying glaucoma can't be as rare as 3 families out of 2 billion
- Deaths: -

Iris hypoplasia with glaucoma, also known as Iris hypoplasia and glaucoma or simply IHG, is a very rare genetic disorder which is characterized by a combination of underdevelopment of the iris and glaucoma. It has been described in three families; two from Russia and one from London, U.K. It was mapped to a duplication of the q25 region of chromosome 6 through the London family. Tooth agenesis can sometimes be associated with this disorder.
