= Ruzicka Goerz Anton syndrome =

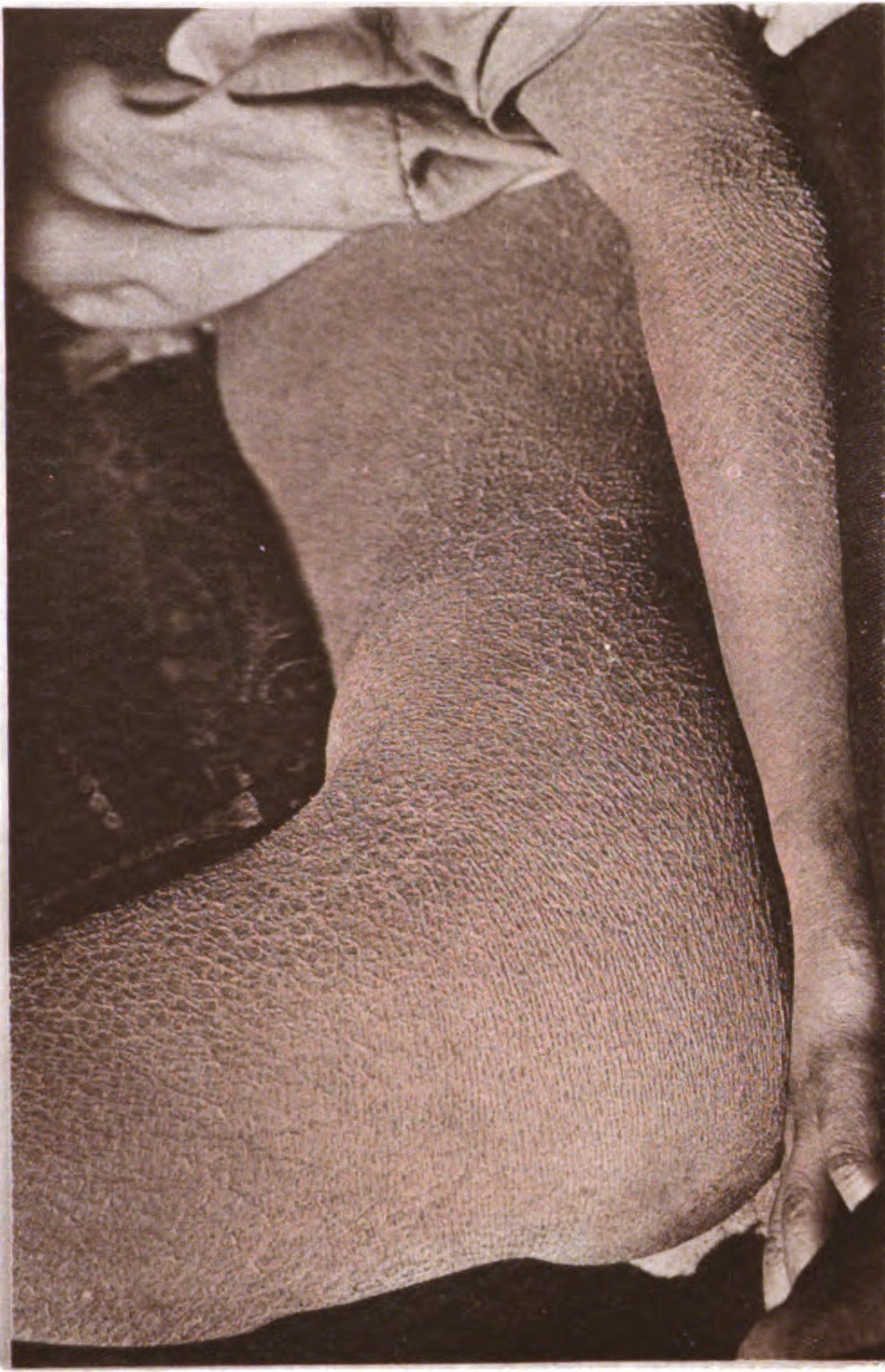
- Patient with Ichthyosis

Ruzicka Goerz Anton syndrome is a rare genetic disease described by Ruzicka et al. in 1981. It is characterized by icthyosis (rough, scaly skin), deafness, intellectual disability, and skeletal anomalies.

It is also known as "Ichthyosis deafness intellectual disability skeletal anomalies".

== Symptoms ==
The primary symptoms of Ruzicka Goerz Anton syndrome include ichthyosis, deafness, oligophrenia, and skeletal deformities.

== Treatment ==
Therapy with Ro 10-9359, a retinoid derivative, results in improvement of the ichthyosis portion of the syndrome.

== History ==
In 1981, a case was studied by Ruzicka et al. of a 15-year-old girl. The patient had ichthyosis congenita as well as deafness and delayed mental development. Further studies showed several skeletal deformities including brachydactyly, clinodactyly, and extra ribs. One year earlier, the patient had developed thyroid carcinoma, but whether or not this is due to the syndrome is unknown. The patient was treated with an oral retinoid, which greatly improved the patient's ichthyosis.

== See also ==
- Ichthyosis
- Brachydactyly
- Clinodactyly
