= Burst suppression =

Abnormal EEG pattern

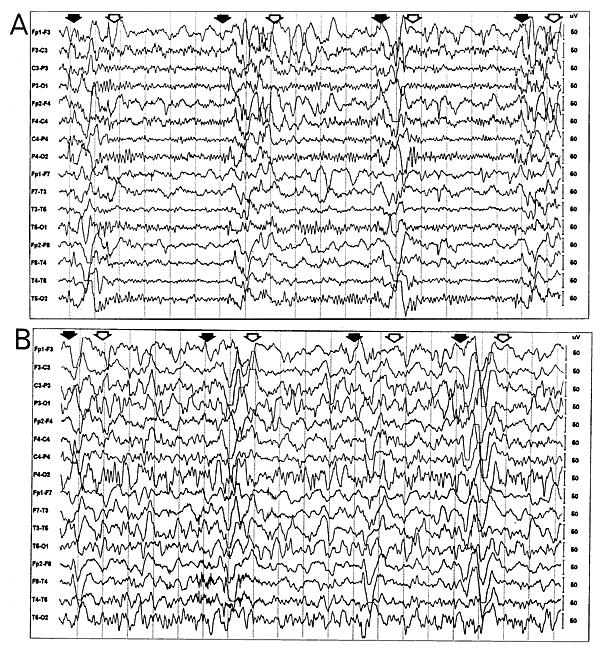
Electroencephalogram (EEG) displaying burst suppression patterns. Onset of bursts are indicated by solid arrows; offset, by open arrows. In both A and B, the interval between each vertical dotted line is one second.

Burst suppression is an electroencephalography (EEG) pattern that is characterized by periods of high-voltage electrical activity alternating with periods of no activity in the brain. The pattern is found in patients with inactivated brain states, such as from general anesthesia, coma, or hypothermia. This pattern can be physiological, as during early development, or pathological, as in diseases such as Ohtahara syndrome.

== History ==
The burst suppression pattern was first observed by Derbyshire et al. while studying effects of anesthetics on feline cerebral cortices in 1936, where the researchers noticed mixed slow and fast electrical activity with decreasing amplitude as anesthesia deepened. In 1948, Swank and Watson coined the term "burst-suppression pattern" to describe the alternation of spikes and flatlines in electrical activity in deep anesthesia. It wasn't until after the early 1960s that the burst suppression pattern began being used in medical settings; it had been primarily observed in animal studies and psychosurgeries.

== Mechanisms ==
A paper published in 2023 showed that burst suppression and epilepsy may share the same ephaptic coupling mechanism. When inhibitory control is sufficiently low, as in the case of certain general anesthetics such as sevoflurane (due to a decrease in the firing of interneurons), electric fields are able to recruit neighboring cells to fire synchronously, in a burst suppression pattern. This same mechanism also underlies epileptic bursts, but the magnitude of bursts is comparatively weaker in burst suppression, as the neuronal network still retains partial inhibitory control under the effects of anesthesia.

== Characteristics ==
The pseudo-rhythmic pattern of burst suppression is dictated by extracellular calcium depletion and the ability of neurons to restore the concentration. Bursts are accompanied by depletion of extracellular cortical calcium ions to levels that inhibit synaptic transmission, which leads to suppression periods. During suppression, neuronal pumps restore the calcium ion concentrations to normal levels, thus causing the cortex to be subject to the process again. As the brain becomes more inactive, burst periods become shorter and suppression periods become longer. The shortening of bursts and lengthening of suppression is caused by the central nervous system's inability to properly regulate calcium levels due to increased blood–brain permeability.

At the cellular level, hyperpolarization of the membrane potential of cortical neurons reliably precedes any overt electroencephalographic activity of burst suppression. This hyperpolarization, which has been attributed to an increase in neuronal membrane potassium conductance, has been hypothesized to play a major role in the induction of burst suppression, supported by the induction of burst suppression through the application of a direct acting GABA_{A} agonist, muscimol. In contrast, inhibition is diminished when burst suppression is induced through the use of isoflurane. Another theory is that alterations in brain metabolism regulate activity dependent slow modulation of ATP-gated potassium channel conductance which induces burst suppression. However, modulating inhibitory activity alone may not be sufficient for burst suppression, and modulation in excitatory synaptic efficiency, stemming from the depletion and subsequent recovery of interstitial calcium levels, could contribute to the induction of burst suppression.

Burst episodes are associated with excitatory activity in cortical neurons. Suppression is caused by the absence of synaptic activity of cortical neurons; however, some thalamocortical neurons exhibit oscillations in the delta frequency range during these periods. The burst suppression pattern varies with the brain anesthetic concentration when pharmacologically inducing coma. Level of suppression is adjustable by decreasing or increasing anesthetic infusion rate, thus adjusting the level of inactivation.

While burst suppression has typically been viewed as a homogeneous brain state, recent studies have shown that bursts and suppressions can occur in specific regions while other regions are unaffected. The fact that the burst suppression pattern persists after a patient undergoes cortical deafferentation indicates that burst suppression represents an intrinsic dynamic mode of cortex. Even when a burst appears to be homogeneous across the brain, the timing of the bursts in different regions may differ.

Burst suppression patterns can be classified through comparisons of burst duration and inter-burst intervals, maximum peak to peak voltage, and the ratio of power in high versus low frequencies. (Akrawi et al., 1996) Burst suppression with identical bursts suggests a deterministic process of burst generation, whereas other burst suppression patterns depend on stochastic processes. Burst suppression with identical bursts is a distinct pathological EEG pattern that is typical in diffuse cerebral ischemia and is associated with poor outcomes in comatose patients after cardiac arrest.

== Electrophysiology ==
Bursts are identifiable on EEG readings by their high amplitude (75-250μV), typically short period of 1–10 seconds, and have frequency ranges of 0–4 Hz (δ) and 4–7 Hz (θ). Suppression episodes are identifiable by their low amplitude (< 5μV) and typically long period (> 10s).

EEG recordings of burst-suppression pattern differ between adults and neonates because of diverse pattern fluctuations found in the EEG of neonates. These fluctuations, along with sudden changes in synchronous neuron firing, are caused by development of the newborn's brain. Burst suppression patterns also occur spontaneously during neonatal development, rather than as a characteristic of inactivated brains as in adults.

=== Quantification ===
In order to quantify the burst suppression pattern, the EEG signal must be subject to segmentation. The first segmentation used a fixed voltage-threshold, and various methods for segmentation or burst detection have developed in time domain, frequency (Fourier) domain, and both. These processes separates burst and suppression episodes based on EEG features such as entropies, non-linear-energy-operator, voltage variance, or adaptation of constant false alarm rate (CFAR) algorithm, etc. When the features represent distinguishable patterns of burst and suppression, a fixed threshold using ROC-curve or machine learning methods are used for segmentation.

Quantifying the burst suppression pattern allows for calculation of the burst suppression ratio (BSR) by assigning binary values of 0 to bursts and 1 to suppression episodes. Thus, a burst suppression ratio of 1 is associated with a state of the brain that shows no electrical activity, while a ratio of 0 indicates that the brain is active. The burst suppression ratio measures the amount of time within an interval spent in the suppressed state. This ratio increases as the brain becomes increasingly inactive until the brain's EEG signal flatlines, represented by a burst suppression ratio equal to 1. Because of the direct relationship between burst suppression ratio and brain inactivity, the ratio is an indicator of suppression intensity.

Using the same binary assignments to the burst suppression pattern, another measure of the depth of burst suppression, the burst suppression probability (BSP), can be determined. Mathematically, the instantaneous probability of being suppressed, is

$$p_i = \frac{e^{x_i}}{1+e^{x_i}},$$

BSR = (Total time of suppression/epoch length) × 100%. where x_{i} is the brain's suppression state at time iΔ, with Δ representing intervals for analysis, and ranges across all real numbers.

== Clinical benefits ==
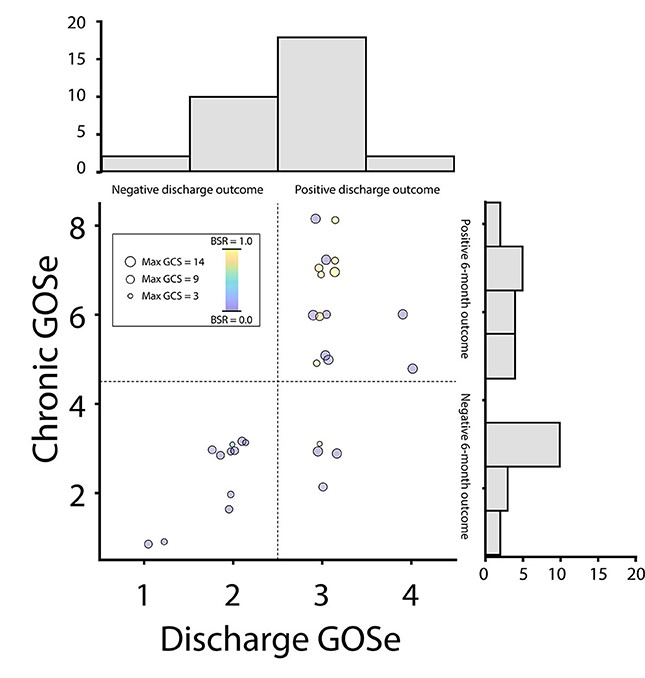
Patients with a high burst suppression ratio (yellow circles) show significantly better recovery from coma (traumatic etiologies) as measured by the Glasgow Outcome Scale extended (GOSe) 6 months post-injury (histogram on vertical axis). Figure from Frohlich et al. 2021 Frontiers in Neurology.

Because the burst suppression pattern is characteristic of inactivated brains, the pattern can be used as a marker for the level of coma a patient is in, with persistence of the pattern commonly associated with poor prognosis. Note, however, that there is evidence linking sedation-induced burst suppression with positive outcomes in patients recovering from coma following traumatic brain injury, suggesting a neuroprotective effect. When inducing coma to protect the brain post trauma, the pattern assists in maintaining the necessary level of coma so that no further damage occurs to the brain. The pattern is also used to test the ability of anesthetic arousal agents to induce emergence from comas. The burst suppression pattern can also be used to track ascent into and descent out of hypothermia through observing changes in the pattern.

Monitoring the burst suppression ratio aids medical personnel in adjusting suppression intensity for therapeutic purposes; however, medical personnel currently rely on visually monitoring the EEG and arbitrarily assessing the depth of burst suppression. Not only is the evaluation of the EEG signal for burst suppression done manually, but also the infusion rate of anesthetic to adjust suppression intensity. The introduction of machines makes maintaining proper levels of inactivity more precise through the use of algorithms. This is done through the use of measures such as burst suppression probability for real-time tracking of burst suppression or brain–machine interfaces to automate maintaining proper levels of inactivity.
