= Infantile apnea =

- Specialty: Pediatric

Infantile apnea is a rare disease that is characterized by cessation of breathing in an infant for at least 20 seconds or a shorter respiratory pause that is associated with a slow heart rate, bluish discolouration of the skin, extreme paleness, gagging, choking and/or decreased muscle tone. Infantile apnea occurs in children under the age of one and it is more common in premature infants. Symptoms of infantile apnea occur most frequently during the rapid eye movement (REM) stage of sleep. The nature and severity of breathing problems in patients can be detected in a sleep study called a polysomnography which measures the brain waves, heartbeat, body movements and breathing of a patient overnight. Infantile apnea can be caused by developmental problems that result in an immature brainstem or it can be caused other medical conditions. As children grow and develop, infantile apnea usually does not persist. Infantile apnea may be related to some cases of sudden infant death syndrome (SIDS) however, the relationship between infantile apnea and SIDS is not known.

== Causes ==
- Having a family history of sleep apnea.
- Being overweight or obese.
- Having certain medical conditions (cerebral palsy, Down syndrome, sickle cell disease, abnormalities in the skull or face)
- Being born with a low birth weight.
- Having a large tongue.

== Diagnosis ==
=== Classification ===
There are three major categories of apnea known as central, obstructive, and mixed apnea.

==== Central Apnea ====
Central apnea is characterized by insufficient responsiveness from respiratory centers such as the medulla, which results in poor coordination of the body systems that are necessary for breathing. Respiratory muscles and nerves to lose the ability to effectively receive and process signals from the brain causing respiratory efforts to cease. Central apnea is quite common and can be found in healthy, full-term infants for short periods of time before breathing patterns in the infant stabilize. In premature infants, central apnea is attributed to an underdeveloped respiratory system which results in decreased response to higher carbon dioxide levels and difficulty breathing. Head trauma may also cause central apnea as it interferes with normal signalling of the central respiratory system, this might be present in infants who suffer from abuse so investigating patient background is an important consideration.

==== Obstructive Apnea ====
Obstructive apnea occurs when the airway passages are obstructed and little to no air exchange occurs, resulting in impaired breathing. In some cases, it occurs when patients are born with a small airway opening. Patients with obstructive apnea often have vigorous inspiratory effort but the efforts are still ineffective. Normally, the muscles at the level of the throat relax and dilate while asleep in order to open up airway however, patients with obstructive apnea may have decreased neuromuscular tone of the muscles responsible for dilating the pharynx during sleep. The inability of the vocal cords to move and the presence of a foreign body may also cause obstructive apnea. Cases of obstructive apnea are rarely found in infants that are healthy.

==== Mixed Apnea ====
Mixed apnea is a combination of both central and obstructive factors. The majority of premature infants with sleep apnea have mixed apnea.

== Epidemiology ==
When infants have a lower birth weight or younger gestational age, there is a greater risk of infantile apnea. With the advancement of neonatal intensive care units and the greater technology available, there are more successful premature births compared to the past. With the greater number of premature infants being born, there is also a greater number of children with infantile apnea. Approximately 85 percent of infants born with a weight less than 2.2 pounds (1 kg) experience infantile apnea within the first month after birth. This risk decreases to 25 percent for infants weighing less than 5.5 pounds (2.5 kg). Studies have found that almost 2% of the pediatric population experience obstructive sleep apnea.
