= C2 domain =

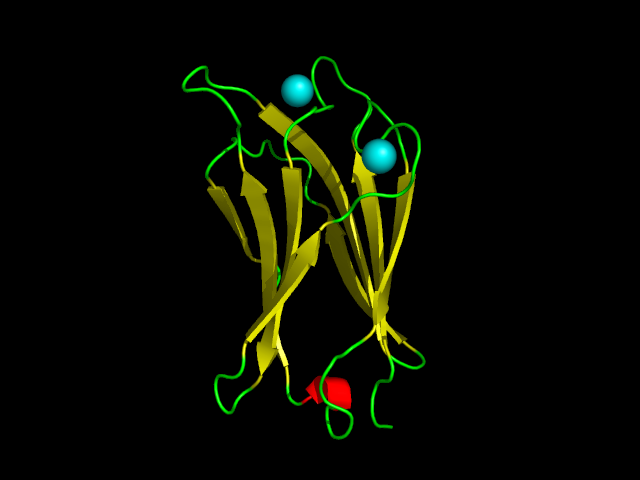
- The C2-domain of C.absonum α-toxin (PDB 1OLP). β-strands are shown in yellow, α-helices in red, loops in green. Co-ordinated calcium ions are in cyan.

Identifiers
- Symbol: C2
- Pfam: PF00168
- Pfam clan: CL0154
- ECOD: 11.2.1
- InterPro: IPR000008
- SMART: C2
- PROSITE: PDOC00380
- SCOP2: 1qas / SCOPe / SUPFAM
- OPM superfamily: 45
- OPM protein: 1ugk
- CDD: cd00030
Available protein structures:
- PDB: IPR000008 PF00168 (ECOD; PDBsum)
- AlphaFold: IPR000008; PF00168

Phosphoinositide 3-kinase C2
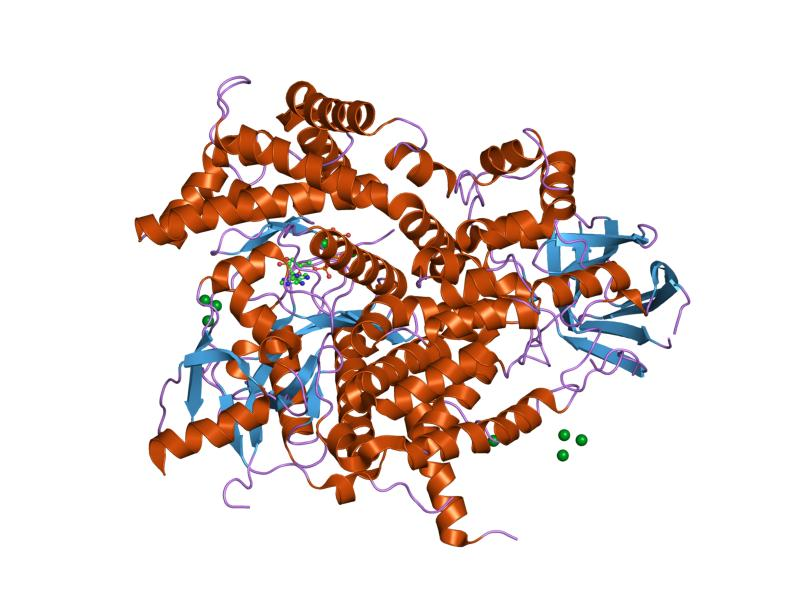
- Structure of phosphoinositide 3-kinase.

Identifiers
- Symbol: PI3K_C2
- Pfam: PF00792
- Pfam clan: CL0154
- ECOD: 11.2.1
- InterPro: IPR002420
- SMART: PI3K_C2
- PROSITE: PDOC50004
- SCOP2: 1e8x / SCOPe / SUPFAM
- CDD: cd08380
Available protein structures:
- PDB: 1e7u, 1e7v, 1e8w, 1e8x, 1e8y, 1e8z, 1e90, 1he8, 2a4z, 2a5u, 2chw, 2chx, 2chz, 2rd0, 2v4l, 3csf, 3cst, 3dbs, 3dpd, 3ene IPR002420 PF00792 (ECOD; PDBsum)
- AlphaFold: IPR002420; PF00792

A C2 domain is a protein structural domain involved in targeting proteins to cell membranes. The typical version (PKC-C2) has a beta-sandwich composed of 8 β-strands that co-ordinates two or three calcium ions, which bind in a cavity formed by the first and final loops of the domain, on the membrane binding face. Many other C2 domain families don't have calcium binding activity.

== Coupling with other domains ==
C2 domains are frequently found coupled to enzymatic domains; for example, the C2 domain in PTEN, brings the phosphatase domain into contact with the plasma membrane, where it can dephosphorylate its substrate, phosphatidylinositol (3,4,5)-trisphosphate (PIP_{3}), without removing it from the membrane - which would be energetically very costly. PTEN consists of two domains, a protein tyrosine phosphatase domain and a C2 domain. This domain pair constitutes a superdomain, a heritable unit that is found in various proteins in fungi, plants and animals. In addition, phosphatidylinositol 3-kinase (PI3-kinase), an enzyme that phosphorylates phosphoinositides on the 3-hydroxyl group of the inositol ring, also uses a C2 domain to bind to the membrane (e.g. 1e8w PDB entry).

== Evolution ==
The C2 domain is currently only known from eukaryotes and the prokaryote Clostridium perfringens where it is part of the alpha-toxin. Over 17 distinct clades of C2 domains have been identified. Most C2 families can be traced back to basal eukaryotic species indicating an early diversification before the last eukaryotic common ancestor (LECA). Only the PKC-C2 domain family contains conserved calcium-binding residues, suggesting the typical calcium-dependent membrane interaction is a derived feature limited in PKC-C2 domains.

== Calcium and lipid selectivity ==
C2 domains are unique among membrane targeting domains in that they show wide range of lipid selectivity for the major components of cell membranes, including phosphatidylserine and phosphatidylcholine. This C2 domain is about 116 amino-acid residues and is located between the two copies of the C1 domain in Protein Kinase C (that bind phorbol esters and diacylglycerol) (see PDOC00379) and the protein kinase catalytic domain (see PDOC00100). Regions with significant homology to the C2-domain have been found in many proteins. The C2 domain is thought to be involved in calcium-dependent phospholipid binding and in membrane targeting processes such as subcellular localisation. Although most C2 domains interact with the membrane (phospholipids) in a Ca^{2+}-dependent manner, some C2 domains can interact with the membrane without binding to Ca^{2+}. Similarly, C2 domains have been evolved to have different specificities for lipids. Many C2 domains such as synaptotagmin C2A, bind to anionic phospholipids (PS or PIP_{2} containing phospholipids). However, other C2 domains such as cPLA2-α C2 domain bind to zwitterionic lipids (e.g. PC). This diversity and selectivity in Ca^{2+} and lipid binding suggest that C2 domains are evolved to have different functions.

== 3D structure ==
The domain forms an eight-stranded beta sandwich constructed around a conserved 4-stranded motif, designated a C2 key. Calcium binds in a cup-shaped depression formed by the N- and C-terminal loops of the C2-key motif. Structural analyses of several C2 domains have shown them to consist of similar ternary structures in which three Ca^{2+}-binding loops are located at the end of an 8 stranded antiparallel beta sandwich.

== Human proteins containing C2 domain ==
ABR; BAIAP3; BCR; C2CD2; C2CD3; CADPS; CADPS2; CAPN5; CAPN6; CC2D1A; CC2D1B; CPNE1; CPNE2; CPNE3; CPNE4; CPNE5; CPNE6; CPNE7; CPNE8; CPNE9; DAB2IP; DOC2A; DOC2B; DYSF; ESYT1; ESYT3; FAM62A; FAM62B; FAM62C; FER1L3; FER1L5; HECW1; HECW2; ITCH; ITSN1; ITSN2; MAP3K20; MCTP1; MCTP2; MTAC2D1; NEDD4; NEDD4L; NEDL1; OTOF; PKN1; PKN2; PKN3; PCLO; PIK3C2A; PIK3C2B; PIK3C2G; PLA2G4A; PLA2G4B; PLA2G4D; PLA2G4E; PLA2G4F; PLCB1; PLCB2; PLCB3; PLCB4; PLCD1; PLCD3; PLCD4; PLCE1; PLCG1; PLCG2; PLCH1; PLCH2; PLCL1; PLCL2; PLCZ1; PRF1; PRKCA; PRKCB1; PRKCD; PRKCE; PRKCG; PRKCH; PRKCQ; RAB11FIP1; RAB11FIP2; RAB11FIP5; RASA1; RASA2; RASA3; RASA4; RASAL1; RASAL2; RGS3; RIMS1; RIMS2; RIMS3; RIMS4; RPGRIP1; RPGRIP1L; RPH3A; SGA72M; SMURF1; SMURF2; SYNGAP1; SYT1; SYT10; SYT11; SYT12; SYT13; SYT14; SYT14L; SYT15; SYT16; SYT17; SYT2; SYT3; SYT4; SYT5; SYT6; SYT7; SYT8; SYT9; SYTL1; SYTL2; SYTL3; SYTL4; SYTL5; TOLLIP; UNC13A; UNC13B; UNC13C; UNC13D; WWC2; WWP1; WWP2; PTEN
