= Synaptotagmin =

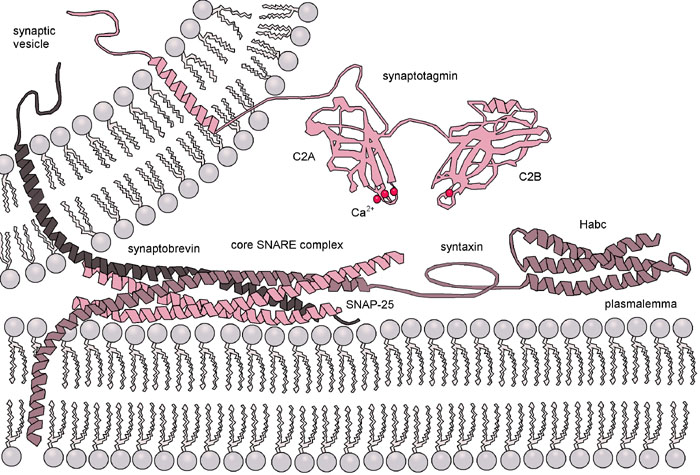
- Molecular machinery driving exocytosis in neurotransmitter release: the core SNARE complex (formed by four α-helices contributed by synaptobrevin, syntaxin and SNAP-25) and the Ca^{2+} sensor synaptotagmin.

Identifiers
- Symbol: SYT
- OPM superfamily: 45
- OPM protein: 3hn8
- Membranome: 199

Synaptotagmins (SYTs) constitute a family of membrane-trafficking proteins that are characterized by an N-terminal transmembrane region (TMR), a variable linker, and two C-terminal C2 domains - C2A and C2B. There are 17 isoforms in the mammalian synaptotagmin family. There are several C2-domain containing protein families that are related to synaptotagmins, including transmembrane (Ferlins, Extended-Synaptotagmin (E-Syt) membrane proteins, and MCTPs) and soluble (RIMS1 and RIMS2, UNC13D, synaptotagmin-related proteins and B/K) proteins. The family includes synaptotagmin 1, a Ca^{2+} sensor in the membrane of the pre-synaptic axon terminal, coded by gene SYT1.

== Functions ==
Based on their brain/endocrine distribution and biochemical properties, in particular C2 domains of certain synaptotagmins bound to calcium, synaptotagmins were proposed to function as calcium sensors in the regulation of neurotransmitter release and hormone secretion. Although synaptotagmins share a similar domain structure and a high degree of homology in the C2 domains, not all synaptotagmins bind to calcium. In fact, only eight out of the seventeen synaptotagmins are capable of calcium binding. The calcium binding synaptotagmins include synaptotagmins 1, 2, 3, 5, 6, 7, 9, and 10. The remaining synaptotagmins do not bind to calcium due to the lack of calcium coordinating residues or spatial orientation of the acidic residues (see the section on C2 domains for details). Synaptotagmins Syt1, Syt2, and Syt9 function as quick release sensors.

Calcium-binding synaptotagmins act as Ca^{2+} sensors and are involved in both:

1. Early synaptic vesicle docking to the presynaptic membrane via interaction with β-neurexin or SNAP-25
2. Late steps of Ca^{2+}-evoked synaptic vesicle fusion with the presynaptic membrane. It was also shown that synaptotagmin 1 can displace complexin from the SNARE complex in the presence of calcium. This is thought to be one of the last steps in exocytosis. Calcium-bound synaptotagmin binding to the SNARE complex, causes the fusion clamp effect of complexin to be released, allowing vesicle fusion to occur and exocytosis to proceed.

Synaptotagmins directly affect the synchronicity of calcium-dependent neurotransmission. While the suppression of Syt1 blocks fast, synchronous neurotransmission, it also enhances slow, asynchronous neurotransmission. On the other hand, suppression of Syt7 hinders the slower, asynchronous release of neurotransmitters. This suggests that synaptotagmin-7 is responsible for mediating a slower form of Ca^{2+}-triggered release while the faster release is induced by synaptotagmin-1. These discrepancies illustrate important distinctions between synaptotagmin isoforms and how they underlie the kinetics of neurotransmission and long-term potentiation.

== C-terminal C2-domains ==
The C2 domain is a widely occurring conserved sequence motif of 130-140 amino acid residues, which was first defined as the second constant sequence in PKC isoforms. The C2 domain was first shown to bind to calcium in synaptotagmin-1. Subsequent atomic structure analysis of synaptotagmin-1 at 1.9 Å resolution indicated that its C2 domains are composed of a stable eight-stranded β-sandwich with flexible loops emerging from the top and bottom. Nuclear magnetic resonance (NMR) studies of synaptotagmin-1 revealed that calcium binds exclusively to the top loops, and the binding pockets are coordinated by five conserved aspartate residues: three calcium ions bind to C2A via D172, D178, D230, D232, S235 and D238, and two calcium ions bind to C2B via D303, D309, D363, 365 and D371. Not all synaptotagmin C2 domains bind to calcium. In fact, based on sequence similarities and subsequent confirmation by biochemical analyses, only eight synaptotagmins bind to calcium, namely, synaptotagmin-1, -2, -3, -5, -6, -7, -9 and -10. The lack of critical residues involved in calcium binding accounts for the majority of failure in calcium-binding by the other synaptotagmins. This includes both C2 domains of synaptotagmin-11, -12, -13, -14 and -15, and C2A domain of synaptotagmin-4 and -8. Synaptotagmin-4 and -11 C2B domains, which possess all five acidic residues in the top loops, however, do not bind to calcium due to spatial orientation of the calcium ligands that fail to form proper calcium binding sites. For calcium-binding synaptotagmins, although amino acid residues in the top loops other than those mentioned above are not directly involved in coordinating calcium binding, they affect calcium binding affinity, such as R233 in synaptotagmin-1. The diversity of sequences and structures flanking the calcium-coordinating amino acid residues renders the eight synaptotagmins bind to calcium at various affinities, covering the full range of calcium requirements for regulated exocytosis.

The C2A domain regulates the fusion step of synaptic vesicle exocytosis. Consistent with this, the kinetics of Ca^{2+}-dependent phospholipid binding activity of the C2A domain in vitro are compatible with the very fast nature of neurotransmitter release (within 200 μs). The C2A domain was shown to bind negatively charged phospholipids in a Ca^{2+}-dependent fashion. Ca^{2+}-binding alters the protein–protein interactions of synaptotagmin such as increasing the affinity of synaptotagmin for syntaxin.

The C2B domain binds to phosphatidylinositol (3,4,5)-trisphosphate (PIP_{3}) in the absence of calcium ions, and to phosphatidylinositol 4,5-bisphosphate (PIP_{2}) in their presence, suggesting that a lipid-interaction switch occurs during depolarization. Ca^{2+}-binding to the C2B domain confers synaptotagmin dimerization involved in the fusion step of synaptic vesicles by Ca^{2+}-dependent self-clustering via the C2B domain. Ca^{2+}-independent is the interaction between the C2B domain and SNAP-25, and between the C2B domain and the "synprint" (synaptic protein interaction) motif of the pore-forming subunit of voltage-gated calcium channels. The C2B domain regulates also the recycling step of synaptic vesicles by binding to the clathrin assembly protein, AP-2.

== Plasticity and Learning ==
Synaptotagmin variants have been implicated in the enhancement of neural connections, leading to long-term potentiation (LTP) in synapses. The localization of synaptotagmin to the endoplasmic reticulum in the cytoplasm drives the growth of these synapses. Synaptotagmins such as Syt1 and Syt7 also play a role in calcium-dependent AMPA receptors exocytosis to the neuron membrane. This process initiates LTP formation and underlies learning. Moreover, synaptotagmins are able to respond to elevated levels of calcium at synapses during single action potentials by further heightening calcium levels via withdrawal from intracellular stores. This leads to a stronger response in the postsynaptic cell.

== Other important roles ==
Synaptotagmins have been shown to regulate exocytosis in other intracellular organelles such as lysosomes. Suppression of Syt7 in astrocytes prevents injury repairment through weakened lysosome exocytosis, suggesting a role of synaptotagmin proteins in mediating repair following brain damage by interacting with lysosomes.

Apart from the molecular events mediated by synaptotagmins, these proteins have also been identified to play a large role in the cognitive realm. Bipolar disorder is an example of one such instance where synaptotagmins exhibit their effects in a larger context. Knockout of synaptotagmin proteins in animal models elicited both manic and depressive-like symptoms, characteristic of BD. This suggests that synaptotagmin depletion is associated with BD pathology.

== Members ==
- Synaptotagmin 1 (SYT1)
- Synaptotagmin 2 (SYT2)
- Synaptotagmin 3 (SYT3)
- Synaptotagmin 4 (SYT4)
- Synaptotagmin 5 (SYT5)
- Synaptotagmin 6 (SYT6)
- Synaptotagmin 7 (SYT7)
- Synaptotagmin 8 (SYT8)
- Synaptotagmin 9 (SYT9)
- Synaptotagmin 10 (SYT10)
- Synaptotagmin 11 (SYT11)
- Synaptotagmin 12 (SYT12)
- Synaptotagmin 13 (SYT13)
- Synaptotagmin 14 (SYT14)
- Synaptotagmin 15 (SYT15)
- Synaptotagmin 16 (SYT16)
- Synaptotagmin 17 (SYT17)
