= Copine =

Group of human proteins

In molecular biology, copines is a name for the group of human proteins that includes members such as CPNE1, CPNE4, CPNE6, and CPNE8. These are highly conserved, calcium-dependent membrane proteins found in a variety of eukaryotes. The domain structure of these 55 kDa proteins suggests that they may have a role in membrane trafficking in some prokaryotes as well as eukaryotes. Copines contains two C2 domains which play a role in signal transduction by binding to calcium, phospholipids, or polyphosphates. Both domains are located at the N-terminal portion of the protein which is not the case for most other double C2 domain proteins, and their role is most similar to that carried out by proteins that exhibit a single C2 domain. The core domain located at the C-terminus part of the copine is found to have a unique and conserved primary sequence. The function of the core domain is still uncertain, however, researchers believe it has a similar function to the "A domain" in integrins. This similarity in function involves serving as a binding site for target proteins, and is supported by evidence that the copine core domain exhibits secondary and tertiary structures comparable to the integrin A domain.
