= RGP3 =

RGP3 may refer to:

- UDP-arabinopyranose mutase, an enzyme
- RGS3, a regulator of G-protein signaling 3
