= C2CD4D =

Mammalian protein found in humans

Identifiers
- Aliases: C2CD4D, FAM148D, C2 calcium-dependent domain containing 4D, C2 calcium dependent domain containing 4D
- External IDs: MGI: 2685505; GeneCards: C2CD4D

Gene location (Human)
Chr.	Chromosome 1 (human)
Band	1q21.3	Start	151,837,818 bp
Band	1q21.3	End	151,840,557 bp

Gene location (Mouse)
Chr.	Chromosome 3 (mouse)
Band	3|3 F2.1	Start	94,269,745 bp
Band	3|3 F2.1	End	94,271,873 bp
RNA expression pattern
Bgee	Human / Mouse (ortholog); Top expressed in: skin of leg; C1 segment; skin of abdomen; superior frontal gyrus; primary visual cortex; sural nerve; prefrontal cortex; olfactory zone of nasal mucosa; granulocyte; Brodmann area 9 / Top expressed in: thymus; lens; proximal tubule; embryo; tail of embryo; duodenum; hypothalamus; liver; neural tube; olfactory bulb; More reference expression data
BioGPS	n/a
Gene ontology
Molecular function	calcium-dependent phospholipid binding; clathrin binding; calcium ion binding; syntaxin binding
Cellular component	plasma membrane; synapse; presynapse
Biological process	vesicle fusion; regulation of calcium ion-dependent exocytosis; calcium ion-regulated exocytosis of neurotransmitter
Sources:Amigo / QuickGO
Orthologs
Databases	NCBI: entry; OMA: entry
Species	Human	Mouse
Entrez	100191040	271944
Ensembl	ENSG00000225556	ENSMUSG00000091648
UniProt	B7Z1M9	P0CG09
RefSeq (mRNA)	NM_001136003; NM_001394591; NM_001394592; NM_001394593	NM_001136117
RefSeq (protein)	NP_001129475	NP_001129589
Location (UCSC)	Chr 1: 151.84 – 151.84 Mb	Chr 3: 94.27 – 94.27 Mb
PubMed search
- Wikidata
View/Edit Human	View/Edit Mouse

C2CD4D, or C2 calcium-dependent domain-containing protein 4D, is a protein product of the human genome. The gene that codes for this protein is found on chromosome 1, from 150,076,963 to 150,079,657. The gene contains 2 exons and encodes 353 amino acids. Synonyms for C2CD4D are "FAM148D" and NP_001129475. C2CD4D contains a conserved metal binding domain that is a known as Protein kinase C conserved region 2, subgroup 1. This motif is known to be a member of the C2 superfamily, which is present in phospholipases, protein kinases C, and synaptotagmins. The amino acid sequence of C2CD4D can be accessed at Prior to any post translational modification, C2CD4D has a molecular weight of 37.6 kdal. Although scientists have not yet determined where C2CD4D functions within the cell, C2CD4D has a predicted isoelectric point of 11.636 which severely limits the places in which it can be effective. In addition, C2CD4D does not contain any predicted transmembrane domains or any predicted signal peptides.

== Expression ==
According to the National Center for Biotechnology Information, C2CD4D has only been found to be expressed in adult individuals with some form of cancer. C2CD4D is not ubiquitously expressed, and thus far scientists have only found C2CD4D expressed in the tissues of the brain, intestine, and mammary gland.

== Evolutionary conservation ==
There are 52 known mammalian orthologs for C2CD4D, found in at least 10 species including Pan troglodytes, Ornithorhynchus anatinus, and Sus scrofa. There are a total of 38 completely conserved residues across these 10 species, corresponding to 10.76% conservation. Within vertebrates conservation remains high at 33 residues, corresponding to 9.3%. However, outside of vertebrates, conservation drops to a maximum of 1.98%, or 3 residues.
