= WWC2 =

Protein-coding gene in the species Homo sapiens

Identifiers
- Aliases: WWC2, BOMB, WW and C2 domain containing 2
- External IDs: MGI: 1261872; GeneCards: WWC2

Gene location (Human)
Chr.	Chromosome 4 (human)
Band	4q35.1	Start	183,099,257 bp
Band	4q35.1	End	183,320,777 bp

Gene location (Mouse)
Chr.	Chromosome 8 (mouse)
Band	8 B1.1|8 26.91 cM	Start	48,276,994 bp
Band	8 B1.1|8 26.91 cM	End	48,443,959 bp
RNA expression pattern
Bgee	Human / Mouse (ortholog); Top expressed in: renal medulla; sural nerve; lower lobe of lung; secondary oocyte; Achilles tendon; retinal pigment epithelium; right lung; stromal cell of endometrium; upper lobe of lung; caput epididymis / Top expressed in: primary oocyte; secondary oocyte; retinal pigment epithelium; zygote; left lung lobe; ciliary body; seminal vesicula; iris; atrioventricular valve; Gonadal ridge; More reference expression data
BioGPS	n/a
Gene ontology
Molecular function	molecular adaptor activity; kinase binding
Cellular component	cytosol
Biological process	negative regulation of organ growth; negative regulation of transcription by RNA polymerase II; negative regulation of hippo signaling
Sources:Amigo / QuickGO
Orthologs
Databases	NCBI: entry; OMA: entry
Species	Human	Mouse
Entrez	80014	52357
Ensembl	ENSG00000151718	ENSMUSG00000031563
UniProt	Q6AWC2	Q6NXJ0
RefSeq (mRNA)	NM_024949	NM_133791
RefSeq (protein)	NP_079225	NP_598552
Location (UCSC)	Chr 4: 183.1 – 183.32 Mb	Chr 8: 48.28 – 48.44 Mb
PubMed search
- Wikidata
View/Edit Human	View/Edit Mouse

WW and C2 domain containing 2 (WWC2) is a protein that in humans is encoded by the WWC2 gene (4q35.1). Though function of WWC2 remains unknown, it has been predicted that WWC2 may play a role in cancer.

== Gene ==
Locus

The human gene WWC2 is found on chromosome 4 at band 4q35.1. The gene is found on the plus strand of the chromosome and is 8,822 base pairs long. The gene contains 23 exons. The WWC2 locus is quite complex and appears to produce several proteins with no sequence overlap

Aliases

A common alias of the gene is BH3-Only Member B (BOMB)

== Homology ==
Paralogs

There are two paralogs of WWC2 found in humans, WWC1 and WWC3. WWC1 is located on chromosome 5 and is a probable regulator of the Hippo signaling pathway that plays a role in tumor suppression by restricting proliferation and promoting apoptosis. WWC3 is located on chromosome X and not much is known about its function.

Sequence	Genus/species	Accession #	Seq. length	Seq. identity
WWC2	Homo sapiens	NP_079225	1192 aa	100%
KIBRA (WWC1)	Homo sapiens	AA015881	1113 aa	49.7%
WWC3	Homo sapiens	NP_056506	1092 aa	41.2%

Orthologs

WWC2 is highly conserved in Mammalia, Aves, Reptilia, and Amphibia, as well as the rare coelacanth, which is more closely related to lungfish, reptiles, and mammals than ray finned fish. WWC2 is conserved in some Actinopterygii, Gastropoda, and Bivalvia. However, WWC2 is not well conserved in Insecta.

Genus/Species	Common name	Date of divergence	Accession #	Seq. identity
Homo sapiens	Human	N/A	NP_079225	100%
Pan troglodytes	Chimpanzee	6.1 MYA	XP_003310624	99%
Heterocephalus glaber	Naked mole rat	91 MYA	EHB18748	88%
Mus musculus	Mouse	91 MYA	NP_598552	86%
Orcinus orca	Killer whale	97.4 MYA	XP_004281794	90%
Bos mutus	Yak	97.4 MYA	XP_005903227	84%
Alligator mississippiensis	Alligator	324.5 MYA	XP_006269678	79.2%
Pelodiscus sinensis	Chinese soft-shelled turtle	324.5 MYA	XP_006130219	79%
Anas platyrhynchos	Mallard	324.5 MYA	EOA93642	78%
Falco peregrinus	Peregrine falcon	324.5 MYA	XP_005230882	77%
Ficedula albicollis	Collared flycatcher	324.5 MYA	XP_005045160	76%
Xenopus (Silurana) tropicalis	Western clawed frog	361.2 MYA	NP_001004872	71%
Ophiophagus hannah	King cobra	362.2 MYA	ETE71408	71%
Latimeria chalumnae	Coelacanth	430 MYA	XP_005989542	72%
Takifugu rubripes	Pufferfish	454.6 MYA	XP_003973883	55%
Danio rerio	Zebrafish	454.6 MYA	XP_689275	53%
Xiphophorus maculatus	Southern platyfish	454.6 MYA	XP_005800442	51%
Aplysia californica	California sea hare (slug)	782.7 MYA	XP_005096216	51%
Crassostrea gigas	Pacific oyster	910 MYA	EKC42771	39%
Anopheles darlingi	Mosquito	910 MYA	ETN67979	34%
Drosophila melanogaster	Fruit fly	910 MYA	AAF55090.2	28.9%

== Protein ==
Primary sequence

The gene encodes a protein also called WWC2 which is 1,192 amino acids long. The molecular weight of the protein is 133.9 kilodaltons. The protein is serine rich with no charge clusters, hydrophobic segments or transmembrane domains. The isoelectric point is 5.23800

Domains and motifs

WWC2 is a member of the WWC protein family which consists of a WW domain and a C2 domain. WWC2 contains two WW domains and one C2 domain. WWC2 also contains two domains of unknown function, DUF342 and DUF444. A leucine zipper is located at position 854.

Post translational modifications

The WWC2 protein is predicted to be highly phosphorylated. There are 89 predicted sites of serine phosphorylation, 17 predicted sites of threonine phosphorylation, and 11 predicted sites of tyrosine phosphorylation. These numbers were relatively consistent in orthologous proteins.

It is also predicted that p38 mitogen-activated protein kinases and glycogen synthase kinase 3 bind at position T3, and casein kinase 2 binds at positions S13 and T50.

== Expression ==
Expression

WWC2 is expressed at a low level, and is tissue specific to the uterus, thyroid, lung, and liver. WWC2 expression is found to be elevated in the blastocyst and fetal stages of development.

Transcript variants

Many transcript variants exist for WWC2. Those that change a highly conserved amino acid residue, or surround a highly conserved amino acid residue are listed below:

SNP	Allele	Protein residue	Amino acid position
rs200024780	A to G	Tyr (T) to Cys (C)	470
rs191286964	C to T	Arg (R) to Cys (C)	1082
rs139606516	G to T	Arg (R) to Leu (L)	1082
rs149738870	A to G	Asn (N) to Ser (S)	1084

== Interacting proteins ==
Transcription factors

Transcription factors with highest matrix scores that bind to sequences within the promoter (ID GXP_1499160) are shown below:

- STAT (signal transducer and activator of transcription)
- Muscle TATA box
- NOLF (neuron-specific olfactory factor)
- XCPE (X gene core promoter element 1)
- CTCF (CCCTC-binding factor)
- HDBP (Huntington's disease gene regulatory region)
- OCT1 (octamer binding protein)
- E2FF (E2F-myc activator cell cycle regulator)
- ZF57 (KRAB domain zinc finger protein 57)
- ZF07 (Cys_{2}His_{2} zinc finger transcription factor 7)
- EGRF (EGR/nerve growth factor induced protein)
- CDEF (cell cycle dependent element - CDF-1 binding site)
- AP2F (activator protein 2)

Proteins

Potential interacting proteins include: YWHAZ, YWHAQ, RUVBL1, and REPS1.

== Clinical significance and Current bioinformation ==
While the exact function of WWC2 remains unknown, several mutations and variants of WWC2 have been researched in disease. A novel missense mutation in WWC2 was analyzed in Restless Leg Syndrome, but was not identified as a candidate gene. One study examined the role of Drosophila KIBRA (WWC1) in the Expanded-Hippo-Warts signaling cascade, which is involved with tumor suppression. The study stated that copy number aberration, translocation, and point mutations of WWC2, as well as other genes, should be further investigated in human cancers. WWC2 alias, BOMB, was researched in a grant suggesting that BOMB, along with two other genes (APOL6 and APOL1) promoted cell death in p53-null HCT116 cells.
