= Complexin =

Synaphin
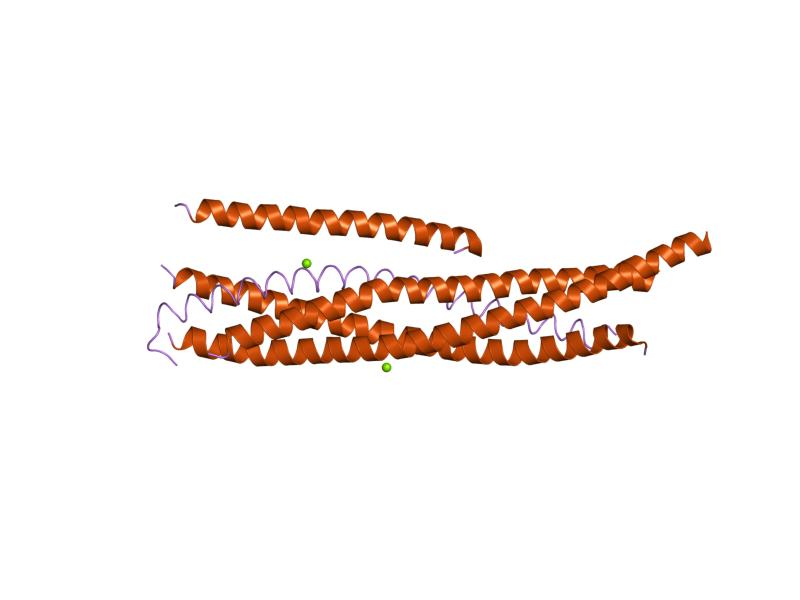
- 3-D structure of the Complexin/SNARE complex

Identifiers
- Symbol: Synaphin
- Pfam: PF05835
- InterPro: IPR008849
- SCOP2: 1l4a / SCOPe / SUPFAM
Available protein structures:
- PDB: IPR008849 PF05835 (ECOD; PDBsum)
- AlphaFold: IPR008849; PF05835

Complexin (also known as synaphin) refers to a one of a small set of eukaryotic cytoplasmic neuronal proteins which binds to the SNARE protein complex (SNAREpin) with a high affinity. These are called synaphin 1 and 2. In the presence of Ca^{2+}, the transport vesicle protein synaptotagmin displaces complexin, allowing the SNARE protein complex to bind the transport vesicle to the presynaptic membrane.

Complexin acts as both an inhibitor and a facilitator of synaptic vesicle fusion and neurotransmitter release. In one conformation, it clamps SNAREpin complexes, preventing vesicle fusion, while in a different conformation it releases the SNAREpins, allowing synaptotagmin to trigger fusion. Whereas complexin is not necessary for synaptic vesicle exocytosis, it does increase neurotransmitter release by 60–70% as demonstrated by complexin gene knockout in mice. A number of human neurological diseases have been linked to a deficiency of complexin.

Synaphin can promote exocytosis by promoting interaction between the complementary syntaxin and synaptobrevin transmembrane regions that reside in opposing membranes prior to fusion.

== Structure and Binding ==
Complexin is a small highly charged cytosolic protein that is hydrophilic, rich in glutamic acid and lysine residues. Complexin's central region (amino acids 48–70) binds to the SNARE core as an anti-parallel α-helix, which attaches complexin to the SNARE complex. It interacts selectively with the ternary SNARE complex but not with monomeric SNARE proteins. Complexin binds to the groove between the synaptobrevin and syntaxin helices. Complexin stabilizes the C-terminal part of the SNARE complex.

== Function ==
Complexin acts as a positive regulator of synaptic vesicle exocytosis, and binds selectively to the neuronal SNARE complex. Complexin has a two-fold function in that it can act as either a promoter or an inhibitor of vesicle fusion. This dual-functionality is dependent upon synaptic activity such as a depolarizing stimulus arriving at the synapse. By acting as a fusion clamp in inhibiting fusion, and a promoter during depolarization, complexin concentration levels regulate vesicle pool size such as that of the ready releasable pool, important for short term response changes.

=== Complexin Acts to Inhibit Fusion - Fusion Clamping ===
Inhibition of fusion is necessary to prevent spontaneous exocytosis of vesicles into the synapse. If a clamp does not hold synaptic vesicle pools stable and inhibit them from fusing, the potential for spontaneous firing and depletion of the vesicle pool is much greater. It is believed that the C-terminal domain of complexin is responsible for this inhibitory function. In several eukaryotic organisms, mutations to complexin were linked to dramatic increases in spontaneous exocytosis rates.

A possible mechanism for how complexin mechanistically anchors vesicles to prevent fusion involves inhibitory binding to the assembling SNARE complex. It is suggested that complexin's N-terminal alpha-helix domain incorporates itself into the SNARE complex helix bundle and prevents zippering of the assembly. In contrast to this, another hypothesis is that complexin, independent of synaptotagmin interactions, cross-links with SNARE complexes in a zig-zag array. Recent data supports the former, that synaptotagmin plays a role in causing a conformational change in SNARE interactions similar to the change caused by calcium. This binding of calcium-bound synaptotagmin creates an interaction that releases the fusion clamp of complexin, causing membrane fusion and exocytosis to occur.

- Calcium Effects

In low levels of calcium, complexin has a comparatively stronger clamping and inhibitory effect on spontaneous vesicle release. This is thought to be countered by synaptotagmin at increasing calcium levels, as the activity of synaptotagmin increases, providing more energy to remove the clamping effect of complexin.

=== Complexin Acts to Promote Fusion ===
Complexin can also promote fusion when a stimulus is transmitted to the synapse. Independent of its clamping functionality (such as when the C-terminal of complexin is knocked out), complexin can still function as an exocytosis promoter. This pathway is mediated by synaptotagmin-10

== Association with Synaptotagmin ==
Complexin knockdown experiments have been linked to Synaptotagmin-1 and -10 dependent exocytosis. Both Synaptotagmin proteins seem reliant on a complexin co-factor, indicating complexin's importance across the synaptotagmin family.

== Genes ==
- CPLX1, CPLX2, CPLX3, CPLX4

== See also ==
- Synaptotagmin
