= SYTL4 =

Protein-coding gene in the species Homo sapiens

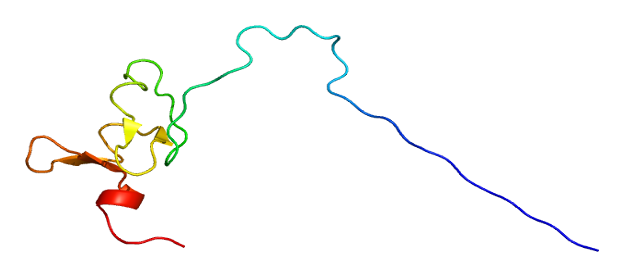

Identifiers
- Aliases: SYTL4, SLP4, synaptotagmin like 4
- External IDs: OMIM: 300723; MGI: 1351606; GeneCards: SYTL4
Available structures
PDB	Ortholog search: PDBe RCSB
PDB	List of PDB id codes 2CSZ, 3FDW

Gene location (Human)
Chr.	X chromosome (human)
Band	Xq22.1	Start	100,674,491 bp
Band	Xq22.1	End	100,732,123 bp

Gene location (Mouse)
Chr.	X chromosome (mouse)
Band	X|X E3	Start	132,837,134 bp
Band	X|X E3	End	132,882,561 bp
RNA expression pattern
Bgee	Human / Mouse (ortholog); Top expressed in: left ovary; right ovary; body of uterus; canal of the cervix; left uterine tube; pituitary gland; anterior pituitary; myometrium; ectocervix; smooth muscle tissue / Top expressed in: superior cervical ganglion; islet of Langerhans; zygote; secondary oocyte; primary oocyte; pituitary gland; blood; epithelium of stomach; cumulus cell; ovary; More reference expression data
BioGPS	n/a
Gene ontology
Molecular function	calcium ion binding; clathrin binding; metal ion binding; protein binding; calcium-dependent phospholipid binding; syntaxin binding; phospholipid binding; neurexin family protein binding
Cellular component	endosome; exocytic vesicle; membrane; transport vesicle membrane; secretory granule; nucleoplasm; cytoplasmic vesicle; presynapse; extrinsic component of membrane; microtubule organizing center; cytosol; plasma membrane; platelet alpha granule membrane; synapse
Biological process	negative regulation of insulin secretion; multivesicular body sorting pathway; positive regulation of protein secretion; positive regulation of exocytosis; intracellular protein transport; exocytosis; vesicle fusion; regulation of calcium ion-dependent exocytosis; calcium ion-regulated exocytosis of neurotransmitter; platelet degranulation; plasma membrane repair
Sources:Amigo / QuickGO
Orthologs
Databases	NCBI: entry; OMA: entry
Species	Human	Mouse
Entrez	94121	27359
Ensembl	ENSG00000102362	ENSMUSG00000031255
UniProt	Q96C24	Q9R0Q1
RefSeq (mRNA)	NM_001129896; NM_001174068; NM_080737	NM_001290717; NM_001290718; NM_001290719; NM_013757
RefSeq (protein)	NP_001123368; NP_001167539; NP_542775; NP_001357089; NP_001357090 NP_001357091; NP_001357092; NP_001357093; NP_001357094; NP_001357095; NP_001357096; NP_001357097; NP_001357098	NP_001277646; NP_001277647; NP_001277648; NP_038785
Location (UCSC)	Chr X: 100.67 – 100.73 Mb	Chr X: 132.84 – 132.88 Mb
PubMed search
- Wikidata
View/Edit Human	View/Edit Mouse

Synaptotagmin-like protein 4 is a protein that in humans is encoded by the SYTL4 gene.
