= RAS p21 protein activator 2 =

Protein-coding gene in the species Homo sapiens

RASA2

Identifiers
- Aliases: RASA2, GAP1M, RAS p21 protein activator 2
- External IDs: OMIM: 601589; MGI: 2149960; GeneCards: RASA2

Gene location (Human)
Chr.	Chromosome 3 (human)
Band	3q23	Start	141,487,027 bp
Band	3q23	End	141,615,344 bp

Gene location (Mouse)
Chr.	Chromosome 9 (mouse)
Band	9|9 E3.3	Start	96,539,300 bp
Band	9|9 E3.3	End	96,631,617 bp
RNA expression pattern
Bgee	Human / Mouse (ortholog); Top expressed in: epithelium of nasopharynx; superficial temporal artery; trabecular bone; nipple; tibia; skin of hip; visceral pleura; Brodmann area 23; parietal pleura; Achilles tendon / Top expressed in: Rostral migratory stream; secondary oocyte; primary oocyte; zygote; median eminence; granulocyte; primary motor cortex; lymph node; mesenteric lymph nodes; olfactory bulb; More reference expression data
BioGPS	n/a
Gene ontology
Molecular function	metal ion binding; GTPase activator activity; phospholipid binding
Cellular component	cytoplasm; cytosol; intrinsic component of the cytoplasmic side of the plasma membrane; perinuclear region of cytoplasm
Biological process	intracellular signal transduction; regulation of GTPase activity; MAPK cascade; positive regulation of GTPase activity; signal transduction; negative regulation of Ras protein signal transduction
Sources:Amigo / QuickGO
Orthologs
Databases	NCBI: entry; OMA: entry
Species	Human	Mouse
Entrez	5922	114713
Ensembl	ENSG00000155903	ENSMUSG00000032413
UniProt	Q15283	P58069
RefSeq (mRNA)	NM_001303245; NM_001303246; NM_006506	NM_053268
RefSeq (protein)	NP_001290174; NP_001290175; NP_006497	NP_444498
Location (UCSC)	Chr 3: 141.49 – 141.62 Mb	Chr 9: 96.54 – 96.63 Mb
PubMed search
- Wikidata
View/Edit Human	View/Edit Mouse

RAS p21 protein activator 2 is a protein that in humans is encoded by the RASA2 gene.

== Function ==
The protein encoded by this gene is member of the GAP1 family of GTPase-activating proteins. The gene product stimulates the GTPase activity of normal RAS p21 but not its oncogenic counterpart. Acting as a suppressor of RAS function, the protein enhances the weak intrinsic GTPase activity of RAS proteins resulting in the inactive GDP-bound form of RAS, thereby allowing control of cellular proliferation and differentiation. Alternative splicing results in multiple transcript variants. [provided by RefSeq, Dec 2014]. It has been shown that RASA2 promotes a shift from noncanonical to canonical TGF-β signaling through SMAD3 in B cells.
