= Copine 3 =

Protein-coding gene in the species Homo sapiens

CPNE3

Identifiers
- Aliases: CPNE3, CPN3, PRO1071, copine 3
- External IDs: OMIM: 604207; MGI: 1917818; GeneCards: CPNE3

Gene location (Human)
Chr.	Chromosome 8 (human)
Band	8q21.3	Start	86,514,435 bp
Band	8q21.3	End	86,561,498 bp

Gene location (Mouse)
Chr.	Chromosome 4 (mouse)
Band	4|4 A3	Start	19,519,254 bp
Band	4|4 A3	End	19,570,108 bp
RNA expression pattern
Bgee	Human / Mouse (ortholog); Top expressed in: trabecular bone; oral cavity; beta cell; bone marrow cell; Achilles tendon; myocardium of left ventricle; gums; mucosa of pharynx; gingival epithelium; skin of thigh / Top expressed in: corneal stroma; lumbar spinal ganglion; conjunctival fornix; pyloric antrum; vestibular membrane of cochlear duct; pineal gland; granulocyte; epithelium of stomach; transitional epithelium of urinary bladder; parotid gland; More reference expression data
BioGPS	n/a
Gene ontology
Molecular function	protein binding; receptor tyrosine kinase binding; protein serine/threonine kinase activity; calcium-dependent protein binding; transporter activity; calcium-dependent phospholipid binding; RNA binding
Cellular component	extracellular exosome; cytoplasm; cytosol; cell junction; nucleus; membrane; focal adhesion; plasma membrane; nucleolus; mitochondrion; azurophil granule membrane
Biological process	ERBB2 signaling pathway; glycerophospholipid biosynthetic process; lipid metabolism; cellular response to growth factor stimulus; positive regulation of cell migration; cellular response to calcium ion; vesicle-mediated transport; protein phosphorylation; neutrophil degranulation
Sources:Amigo / QuickGO
Orthologs
Databases	NCBI: entry; OMA: entry
Species	Human	Mouse
Entrez	8895	70568
Ensembl	ENSG00000085719	ENSMUSG00000028228
UniProt	O75131	Q8BT60
RefSeq (mRNA)	NM_003909	NM_027769; NM_001356481
RefSeq (protein)	NP_003900	NP_082045; NP_001343410
Location (UCSC)	Chr 8: 86.51 – 86.56 Mb	Chr 4: 19.52 – 19.57 Mb
PubMed search
- Wikidata
View/Edit Human	View/Edit Mouse

Copine 3 is a protein that in humans is encoded by the CPNE3 gene.

== Function ==
Calcium-dependent membrane-binding proteins may regulate molecular events at the interface of the cell membrane and cytoplasm. This gene encodes a protein which contains two type II C2 domains in the amino-terminus and an A domain-like sequence in the carboxy-terminus. The A domain mediates interactions between integrins and extracellular ligands. [provided by RefSeq, Aug 2008].
