= CADPS2 =

Protein-coding gene in humans

Identifiers
- Aliases: CADPS2, CAPS2, calcium dependent secretion activator 2
- External IDs: OMIM: 609978; MGI: 2443963; GeneCards: CADPS2

Gene location (Human)
| Chr. | Chromosome 7 (human) |
| Band | 7q31.32 | Start | 122,318,411 bp |
| Band | 7q31.32 | End | 122,886,759 bp |

Gene location (Mouse)
| Chr. | Chromosome 6 (mouse) |
| Band | 6|6 A3.1 | Start | 23,262,772 bp |
| Band | 6|6 A3.1 | End | 23,839,420 bp |
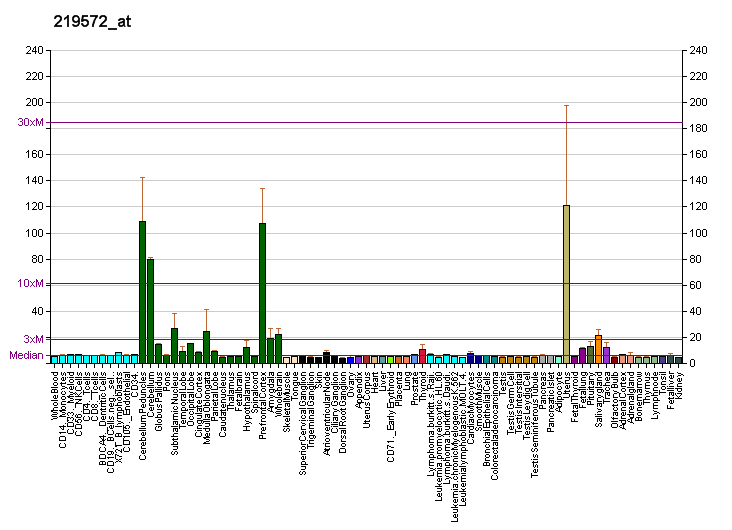
RNA expression pattern
| Bgee | Human / Mouse (ortholog); Top expressed in: cerebellar vermis; cerebellar hemisphere; right hemisphere of cerebellum; parotid gland; Brodmann area 23; primary visual cortex; endothelial cell; middle temporal gyrus; gastric mucosa; Brodmann area 46 / Top expressed in: habenula; gray matter layer of cerebellum; lobe of cerebellum; suprachiasmatic nucleus; cerebellar vermis; granular layer; Region I of hippocampus proper; substantia nigra; subiculum; olfactory system; More reference expression data |
| BioGPS | More reference expression data |
Gene ontology
| Molecular function | metal ion binding; lipid binding |
| Cellular component | cell junction; postsynaptic membrane; cytoplasmic vesicle; synapse; cytoplasmic vesicle membrane; presynaptic membrane; intracellular membrane-bounded organelle; membrane; nucleoplasm; parallel fiber to Purkinje cell synapse; presynapse; glutamatergic synapse |
| Biological process | exocytosis; protein transport; cellular response to starvation; positive regulation of exocytosis; synaptic vesicle priming; dense core granule exocytosis; synaptic vesicle exocytosis |
Sources:Amigo / QuickGO
Orthologs
| Databases | NCBI: entry; OMA: entry |
| Species | Human | Mouse |
| Entrez | 93664 | 320405 |
| Ensembl | ENSG00000081803 | ENSMUSG00000017978 |
| UniProt | Q86UW7 | Q8BYR5 |
| RefSeq (mRNA) | NM_001009571; NM_001167940; NM_017954; NM_001363389; NM_001363390 NM_001363391; NM_001363392; NM_001363393; NM_001363394; NM_001363395; NM_001363396; NM_001363397; NM_001363398; NM_001363399; NM_001363400 | NM_001252105; NM_001252106; NM_001252107; NM_001252108; NM_001252109 NM_001252110; NM_153163 |
| RefSeq (protein) | NP_001009571; NP_001161412; NP_060424; NP_001350318; NP_001350319 NP_001350320; NP_001350321; NP_001350322; NP_001350323; NP_001350324; NP_001350325; NP_001350326; NP_001350327; NP_001350328; NP_001350329 | NP_001239034; NP_001239035; NP_001239036; NP_001239037; NP_001239038 NP_001239039; NP_694803; NP_001390537; NP_001390559 |
| Location (UCSC) | Chr 7: 122.32 – 122.89 Mb | Chr 6: 23.26 – 23.84 Mb |
| PubMed search |
- Wikidata
| View/Edit Human | View/Edit Mouse |

Calcium-dependent secretion activator 2 is a protein that in humans is encoded by the CADPS2 gene.

== Function ==
This gene encodes a member of the calcium-dependent activator of secretion (CAPS) protein family, which are calcium-binding proteins that regulate the exocytosis of synaptic and dense-core vesicles in neurons and neuroendocrine cells.

== Interactions ==
This gene interacts with brain-derived neurotrophic factor.

== Clinical significance ==
Cadps2 has been linked to autism and is in the 7q autism susceptibility locus (AUTS1). However, the finding of aberrant CADPS2 splicing was not found to be significant in another study.

A knockout mouse model was found to have autistic-like characteristics.

CADPS2 has been linked to human and mouse brain structure in two large genomic studies.
