= Synaptotagmin-14 =

Protein found in humans

SYT14

Identifiers
- Aliases: SYT14, SCAR11, sytXIV, synaptotagmin 14
- External IDs: OMIM: 610949; MGI: 2444490; GeneCards: SYT14

Gene location (Human)
Chr.	Chromosome 1 (human)
Band	1q32.2	Start	209,900,923 bp
Band	1q32.2	End	210,171,389 bp

Gene location (Mouse)
Chr.	Chromosome 1 (mouse)
Band	1|1 H6	Start	192,573,541 bp
Band	1|1 H6	End	192,718,083 bp
RNA expression pattern
Bgee	Human / Mouse (ortholog); Top expressed in: testicle; islet of Langerhans; gonad; ganglionic eminence; cerebellar hemisphere; stromal cell of endometrium; right hemisphere of cerebellum; ventricular zone; anterior pituitary; prefrontal cortex / Top expressed in: otolith organ; utricle; superior cervical ganglion; vestibular sensory epithelium; trigeminal ganglion; lumbar spinal ganglion; hand; medial ganglionic eminence; olfactory epithelium; islet of Langerhans; More reference expression data
BioGPS	n/a
Gene ontology
Molecular function	calcium-dependent phospholipid binding; clathrin binding; calcium ion binding; syntaxin binding
Cellular component	integral component of membrane; membrane; plasma membrane; synapse; presynapse
Biological process	calcium ion-regulated exocytosis of neurotransmitter; vesicle fusion; regulation of calcium ion-dependent exocytosis
Sources:Amigo / QuickGO
Orthologs
Databases	NCBI: entry; OMA: entry
Species	Human	Mouse
Entrez	255928	329324
Ensembl	ENSG00000143469	ENSMUSG00000016200
UniProt	Q8NB59	Q7TN84
RefSeq (mRNA)	NM_001146261; NM_001146262; NM_001146264; NM_001256006; NM_153262 NM_001397544; NM_001397545	NM_001301370; NM_181546
RefSeq (protein)	NP_001139733; NP_001139734; NP_001139736; NP_001242935; NP_694994	NP_001288299; NP_853524
Location (UCSC)	Chr 1: 209.9 – 210.17 Mb	Chr 1: 192.57 – 192.72 Mb
PubMed search
- Wikidata
View/Edit Human	View/Edit Mouse

Synaptotagmin XIV is a protein that in humans is encoded by the SYT14 gene.

== Function ==
This gene is a member of the synaptotagmin gene family and encodes a protein similar to other family members that mediate membrane trafficking in synaptic transmission. The encoded protein is a calcium-independent synaptotagmin.

== Clinical relevance ==
Mutations in this gene have been shown to cause autosomal recessive spinocerebellar ataxia with psychomotor retardation.
