= UDP-arabinopyranose mutase =

Class of enzymes

Identifiers
- EC no.: 5.4.99.30

Databases
- BRENDA: enzyme data
- ExPASy: NiceZyme view
- KEGG: enzyme entry
- MetaCyc: metabolic pathway
- Rhea: reactions
- PDB structures: RCSB PDB PDBe PDBsum
Search
- PMC: articles
- PubMed: articles
- NCBI: proteins

UDP-arabinopyranose mutase (EC 5.4.99.30, Os03g40270 protein, UAM1, UAM3, RGP1, RGP3, OsUAM1, OsUAM2, Os07g41360 protein) is an enzyme with systematic name UDP-arabinopyranose pyranomutase. This enzyme catalyses the following chemical reaction

UDP-beta-L-arabinofuranose $\rightleftharpoons$ UDP-beta-L-arabinopyranose

The reaction is reversible. Enzymes from this class have been found in plants including peas, potatoes, rice, date palms, and mouse-ear cress. In mouse ear cress, these enzymes are encoded by the genes RGP1 and RPG3 (not to be confused with the human gene RGP1).
