= CC2D1A =

Protein-coding gene in the species Homo sapiens

Identifiers
- Aliases: CC2D1A, FREUD-1, Freud-1/Aki1, MRT3, coiled-coil and C2 domain containing 1A
- External IDs: OMIM: 610055; MGI: 2384831; GeneCards: CC2D1A

Gene location (Human)
Chr.	Chromosome 19 (human)
Band	19p13.12	Start	13,906,201 bp
Band	19p13.12	End	13,930,879 bp

Gene location (Mouse)
Chr.	Chromosome 8 (mouse)
Band	8|8 C2	Start	84,859,457 bp
Band	8|8 C2	End	84,874,565 bp
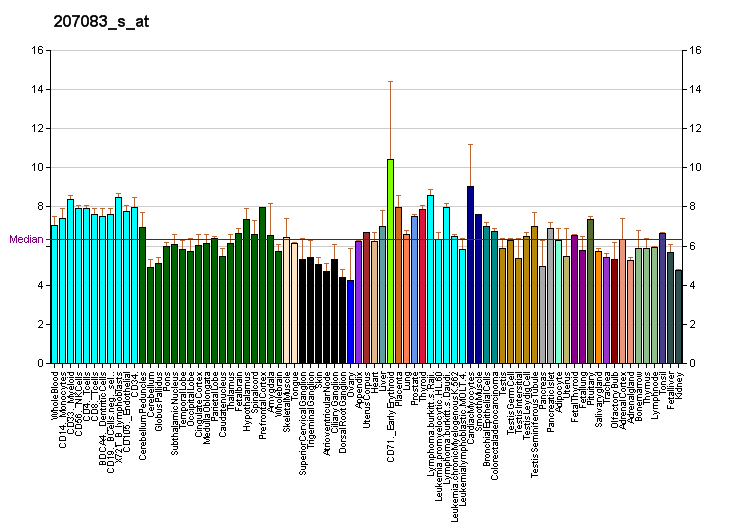

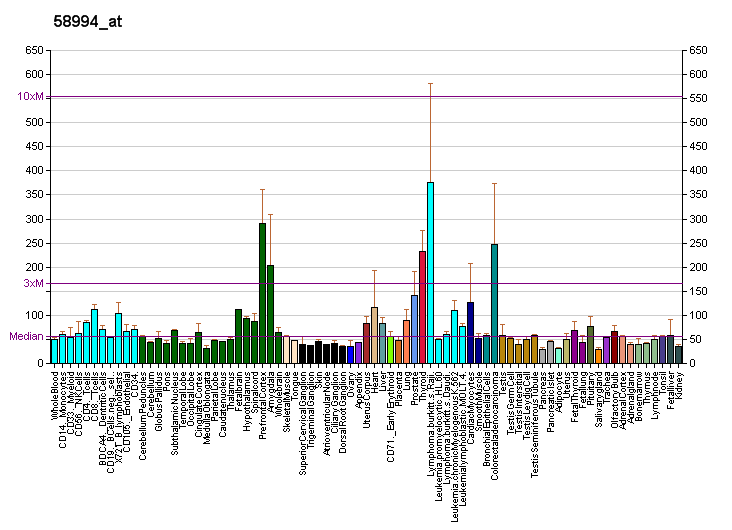

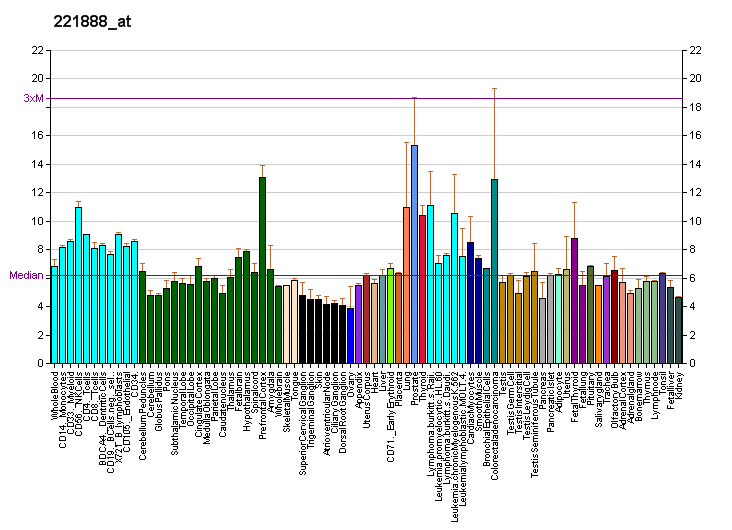
RNA expression pattern
Bgee	Human / Mouse (ortholog); Top expressed in: right hemisphere of cerebellum; mucosa of transverse colon; right frontal lobe; pituitary gland; hypothalamus; right uterine tube; primary visual cortex; anterior pituitary; duodenum; anterior cingulate cortex / Top expressed in: saccule; internal carotid artery; otic vesicle; external carotid artery; lip; primary oocyte; zygote; granulocyte; otic placode; dentate gyrus of hippocampal formation granule cell; More reference expression data
BioGPS	More reference expression data
Gene ontology
Molecular function	RNA polymerase II cis-regulatory region sequence-specific DNA binding; DNA-binding transcription factor activity, RNA polymerase II-specific; DNA binding; DNA-binding transcription repressor activity, RNA polymerase II-specific; protein binding; signal transducer activity; cadherin binding
Cellular component	cytoplasm; extracellular exosome; cytoskeleton; nucleus; membrane; microtubule organizing center; fibrillar center; cytosol; plasma membrane
Biological process	positive regulation of I-kappaB kinase/NF-kappaB signaling; regulation of transcription, DNA-templated; negative regulation of transcription by RNA polymerase II; transcription, DNA-templated; signal transduction
Sources:Amigo / QuickGO
Orthologs
Databases	NCBI: entry; OMA: entry
Species	Human	Mouse
Entrez	54862	212139
Ensembl	ENSG00000132024	ENSMUSG00000036686
UniProt	Q6P1N0	Q8K1A6
RefSeq (mRNA)	NM_017721	NM_145970; NM_001381871; NM_001381872; NM_001381873
RefSeq (protein)	NP_060191	NP_666082; NP_001368800; NP_001368801; NP_001368802
Location (UCSC)	Chr 19: 13.91 – 13.93 Mb	Chr 8: 84.86 – 84.87 Mb
PubMed search
- Wikidata
View/Edit Human	View/Edit Mouse

Coiled-coil and C2 domain-containing protein 1A is a protein that in humans is encoded by the CC2D1A gene.
