= Extended synaptotagmin-1 =

Protein-coding gene in the species Homo sapiens

ESYT1

Identifiers
- Aliases: ESYT1, FAM62A, MBC2, extended synaptotagmin protein 1, extended synaptotagmin 1
- External IDs: OMIM: 616670; MGI: 1344426; GeneCards: ESYT1

Gene location (Human)
| Chr. | Chromosome 12 (human) |
| Band | 12q13.2 | Start | 56,118,250 bp |
| Band | 12q13.2 | End | 56,144,674 bp |

Gene location (Mouse)
| Chr. | Chromosome 10 (mouse) |
| Band | 10|10 D3 | Start | 128,345,834 bp |
| Band | 10|10 D3 | End | 128,361,740 bp |
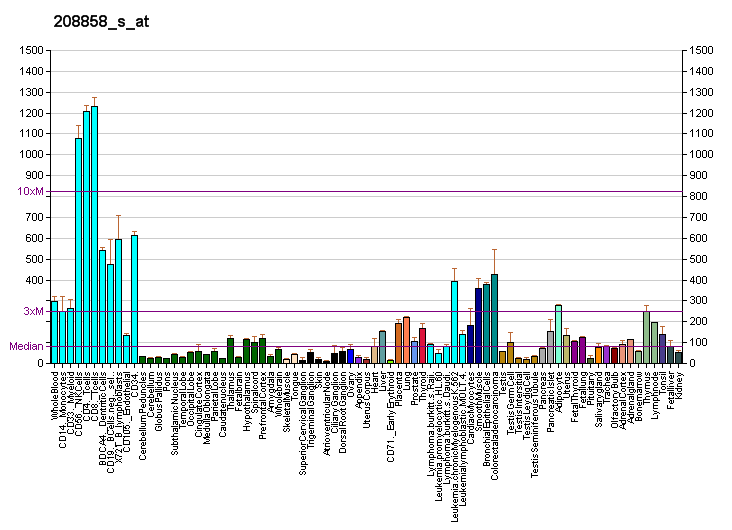
RNA expression pattern
| Bgee | Human / Mouse (ortholog); Top expressed in: abdominal fat; granulocyte; right uterine tube; gastric mucosa; body of uterus; subcutaneous adipose tissue; right coronary artery; Descending thoracic aorta; popliteal artery; tibial arteries / Top expressed in: granulocyte; lip; esophagus; muscle of thigh; zygote; ascending aorta; thymus; pharynx; tail of embryo; aortic valve; More reference expression data |
| BioGPS | More reference expression data |
Gene ontology
| Molecular function | protein binding; metal ion binding; lipid binding; identical protein binding; calcium ion binding; calcium-dependent phospholipid binding; phosphatidylethanolamine binding; phosphatidylcholine binding; phosphatidylinositol binding |
| Cellular component | organelle membrane contact site; integral component of membrane; integral component of endoplasmic reticulum membrane; plasma membrane; membrane; endoplasmic reticulum; endoplasmic reticulum membrane; intracellular membrane-bounded organelle; intrinsic component of endoplasmic reticulum membrane; extrinsic component of cytoplasmic side of plasma membrane |
| Biological process | lipid transport; glycosphingolipid metabolic process; transport; endoplasmic reticulum-plasma membrane tethering |
Sources:Amigo / QuickGO
Orthologs
| Databases | NCBI: entry; OMA: entry |
| Species | Human | Mouse |
| Entrez | 23344 | 23943 |
| Ensembl | ENSG00000139641 | ENSMUSG00000025366 |
| UniProt | Q9BSJ8 | Q3U7R1 |
| RefSeq (mRNA) | NM_015292; NM_001184796 | NM_011843 |
| RefSeq (protein) | NP_001171725; NP_056107 | NP_035973 |
| Location (UCSC) | Chr 12: 56.12 – 56.14 Mb | Chr 10: 128.35 – 128.36 Mb |
| PubMed search |
- Wikidata
| View/Edit Human | View/Edit Mouse |

Extended synaptotagmin-1 is a protein in humans that is encoded by the ESYT1 gene.
