= Phospholipase A2 group IVD =

Protein-coding gene in the species Homo sapiens

PLA2G4D

Identifiers
- Aliases: PLA2G4D, cPLA2delta, phospholipase A2 group IVD
- External IDs: OMIM: 612864; MGI: 1925640; GeneCards: PLA2G4D
Available structures
PDB	Ortholog search: PDBe RCSB
PDB	List of PDB id codes 5IXC, 5IZR, 5IZ5
Enzyme activity
EC #	BRENDA	ExPASy	KEGG	MetaCyc
3.1.1.4	↗	↗	↗	↗

Gene location (Human)
Chr.	Chromosome 15 (human)
Band	15q15.1	Start	42,067,009 bp
Band	15q15.1	End	42,094,562 bp

Gene location (Mouse)
Chr.	Chromosome 2 (mouse)
Band	2|2 E5	Start	120,096,076 bp
Band	2|2 E5	End	120,119,678 bp
RNA expression pattern
Bgee	Human / Mouse (ortholog); Top expressed in: skin of abdomen; skin of leg; gonad; testicle; vagina; pituitary gland; anterior pituitary; prostate; ectocervix; endometrium / Top expressed in: esophagus; primary oocyte; placenta; secondary oocyte; decidua; spermatid; embryo; lumbar subsegment of spinal cord; zygote; seminiferous tubule; More reference expression data
BioGPS	n/a
Gene ontology
Molecular function	phospholipase activity; metal ion binding; hydrolase activity; phospholipase A1 activity; lysophospholipase activity; phospholipase A2 activity; calcium-dependent phospholipase A2 activity; calcium ion binding; calcium-dependent phospholipid binding
Cellular component	cytoplasm; cytosol; membrane
Biological process	phosphatidic acid biosynthetic process; phosphatidylserine acyl-chain remodeling; phosphatidylethanolamine acyl-chain remodeling; lipid metabolism; phosphatidylinositol acyl-chain remodeling; lipid catabolic process; phosphatidylglycerol acyl-chain remodeling; phospholipid catabolic process; phospholipid metabolic process; metabolism; phosphatidylcholine acyl-chain remodeling; glycerophospholipid catabolic process; fatty acid metabolic process
Sources:Amigo / QuickGO
Orthologs
Databases	NCBI: entry; OMA: entry
Species	Human	Mouse
Entrez	283748	78390
Ensembl	ENSG00000159337	ENSMUSG00000070719
UniProt	Q86XP0	Q50L43
RefSeq (mRNA)	NM_178034	NM_001024137
RefSeq (protein)	NP_828848	NP_001019308
Location (UCSC)	Chr 15: 42.07 – 42.09 Mb	Chr 2: 120.1 – 120.12 Mb
PubMed search
- Wikidata
View/Edit Human	View/Edit Mouse

Phospholipase A2 group IVD is a protein that in humans is encoded by the PLA2G4D gene.

== Function ==
The phospholipase A2 enzyme family, including PLA2G4D, catalyze the hydrolysis of glycerophospholipids at the sn-2 position and then liberate free fatty acids and lysophospholipids.
