= CAPN5 =

Protein-coding gene in humans

Identifiers
- Aliases: CAPN5, ADNIV, HTRA3, VRNI, nCL-3, calpain 5
- External IDs: OMIM: 602537; MGI: 1100859; GeneCards: CAPN5

Gene location (Human)
Chr.	Chromosome 11 (human)
Band	11q13.5	Start	77,066,961 bp
Band	11q13.5	End	77,126,155 bp

Gene location (Mouse)
Chr.	Chromosome 7 (mouse)
Band	7|7 E1	Start	98,121,559 bp
Band	7|7 E1	End	98,178,274 bp
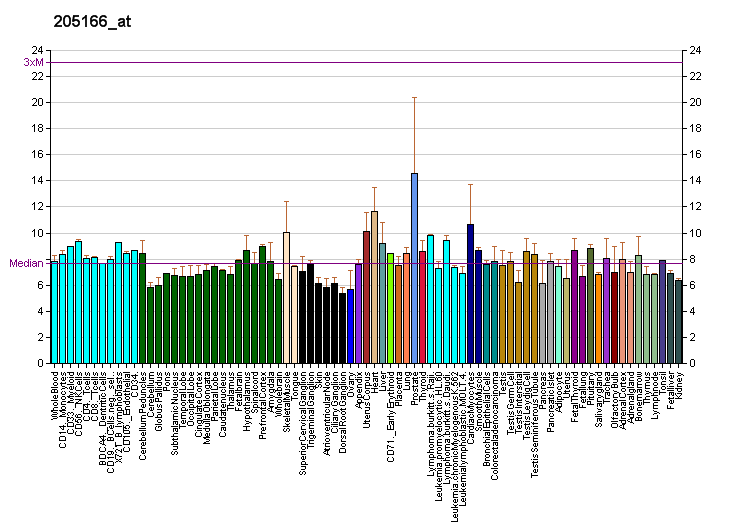
RNA expression pattern
Bgee	Human / Mouse (ortholog); Top expressed in: mucosa of transverse colon; rectum; gallbladder; right lobe of liver; stromal cell of endometrium; mucosa of esophagus; duodenum; body of stomach; mucosa of ileum; palpebral conjunctiva / Top expressed in: transitional epithelium of urinary bladder; lumbar spinal ganglion; pyloric antrum; epithelium of stomach; conjunctival fornix; mucous cell of stomach; perirhinal cortex; fetal liver hematopoietic progenitor cell; corneal stroma; entorhinal cortex; More reference expression data
BioGPS	More reference expression data
Gene ontology
Molecular function	peptidase activity; cysteine-type peptidase activity; hydrolase activity; calcium-dependent cysteine-type endopeptidase activity
Cellular component	cell surface; extracellular exosome; intracellular anatomical structure; focal adhesion; cytoplasm
Biological process	signal transduction; proteolysis
Sources:Amigo / QuickGO
Orthologs
Databases	NCBI: entry; OMA: entry
Species	Human	Mouse
Entrez	726	12337
Ensembl	ENSG00000149260	ENSMUSG00000035547
UniProt	O15484	O08688
RefSeq (mRNA)	NM_004055	NM_001301250; NM_007602
RefSeq (protein)	NP_004046	NP_001288179; NP_031628
Location (UCSC)	Chr 11: 77.07 – 77.13 Mb	Chr 7: 98.12 – 98.18 Mb
PubMed search
- Wikidata
View/Edit Human	View/Edit Mouse

Calpain-5 is a protein that in humans is encoded by the CAPN5 gene.

Calpains are calcium-dependent cysteine proteases involved in signal transduction in a variety of cellular processes. A functional calpain protein consists of an invariant small subunit and 1 of a family of large subunits. CAPN5 is one of the large subunits. Unlike some of the calpains, CAPN5 and CAPN6 lack a calmodulin-like domain IV. Because of the significant similarity to Caenorhabditis elegans sex determination gene tra-3, CAPN5 is also called as HTRA3.
