= PLA2G4E =

Protein-coding gene in the species Homo sapiens

Identifiers
- Aliases: PLA2G4E, phospholipase A2 group IVE
- External IDs: MGI: 1919144; GeneCards: PLA2G4E
Enzyme activity
EC #	BRENDA	ExPASy	KEGG	MetaCyc
3.1.1.4	↗	↗	↗	↗

Gene location (Human)
Chr.	Chromosome 15 (human)
Band	15q15.1	Start	41,981,394 bp
Band	15q15.1	End	42,051,190 bp

Gene location (Mouse)
Chr.	Chromosome 2 (mouse)
Band	2|2 E5	Start	119,996,893 bp
Band	2|2 E5	End	120,075,816 bp
RNA expression pattern
Bgee	Human / Mouse (ortholog); Top expressed in: skin of leg; skin of abdomen; gonad; tonsil; vagina; skeletal muscle tissue; muscle of leg; gastrocnemius muscle; muscle of thigh; olfactory zone of nasal mucosa / Top expressed in: lip; muscle of thigh; knee joint; esophagus; quadriceps femoris muscle; soleus muscle; skeletal muscle tissue; gastrocnemius muscle; temporal muscle; primary visual cortex; More reference expression data
BioGPS	n/a
Gene ontology
Molecular function	hydrolase activity; phospholipase activity; metal ion binding; phospholipase A2 activity; phospholipase A1 activity; lysophospholipase activity; calcium ion binding; calcium-dependent phospholipid binding; calcium-dependent phospholipase A2 activity
Cellular component	lysosomal membrane; cytosol; cytoplasm; lysosome; membrane
Biological process	lipid metabolism; lipid catabolic process; metabolism; phosphatidylserine acyl-chain remodeling; phosphatidylethanolamine acyl-chain remodeling; phospholipid metabolic process; phosphatidylcholine acyl-chain remodeling; phospholipid catabolic process; phosphatidylinositol acyl-chain remodeling; glycerophospholipid catabolic process
Sources:Amigo / QuickGO
Orthologs
Databases	NCBI: entry; OMA: entry
Species	Human	Mouse
Entrez	123745	329502
Ensembl	ENSG00000188089	ENSMUSG00000050211
UniProt	Q3MJ16	Q50L42
RefSeq (mRNA)	NM_001080490; NM_001206670; NM_001395548; NM_198442	NM_177845; NM_001363090; NM_001363091; NM_001395470
RefSeq (protein)	NP_001193599	NP_808513; NP_001350019; NP_001350020; NP_001382399
Location (UCSC)	Chr 15: 41.98 – 42.05 Mb	Chr 2: 120 – 120.08 Mb
PubMed search
- Wikidata
View/Edit Human	View/Edit Mouse

Phospholipase A2 group IVE is a protein that in humans is encoded by the PLA2G4E gene.

== Function ==
This gene encodes a member of the cytosolic phospholipase A2 group IV family. Members of this family are involved in regulation of membrane tubule-mediated transport. The enzyme encoded by this member of the family plays a role in trafficking through the clathrin-independent endocytic pathway. The enzyme regulates the recycling process via formation of tubules that transport internalized clathrin-independent cargo proteins back to the cell surface. [provided by RefSeq, Jan 2017].
