= CPNE7 =

Protein-coding gene in humans

Identifiers
- Aliases: CPNE7, copine 7
- External IDs: OMIM: 605689; MGI: 2142747; GeneCards: CPNE7

Gene location (Human)
Chr.	Chromosome 16 (human)
Band	16q24.3	Start	89,575,758 bp
Band	16q24.3	End	89,597,246 bp

Gene location (Mouse)
Chr.	Chromosome 8 (mouse)
Band	8|8 E1	Start	123,844,113 bp
Band	8|8 E1	End	123,861,921 bp
RNA expression pattern
Bgee	Human / Mouse (ortholog); Top expressed in: lateral nuclear group of thalamus; stromal cell of endometrium; parotid gland; pituitary gland; cingulate gyrus; anterior cingulate cortex; anterior pituitary; right frontal lobe; hypothalamus; dorsal motor nucleus of vagus nerve / Top expressed in: subiculum; dentate gyrus of hippocampal formation granule cell; primary visual cortex; hippocampus proper; medial dorsal nucleus; superior frontal gyrus; lateral septal nucleus; anterior amygdaloid area; nucleus of stria terminalis; subdivision of hippocampus; More reference expression data
BioGPS	n/a
Gene ontology
Molecular function	protein binding; transporter activity; calcium-dependent phospholipid binding
Cellular component	cytoplasm; plasma membrane; extracellular exosome; membrane; nucleus
Biological process	cellular response to calcium ion; glycerophospholipid biosynthetic process; lipid metabolism; transport
Sources:Amigo / QuickGO
Orthologs
Databases	NCBI: entry; OMA: entry
Species	Human	Mouse
Entrez	27132	102278
Ensembl	ENSG00000178773	ENSMUSG00000034796
UniProt	Q9UBL6	Q0VE82
RefSeq (mRNA)	NM_014427; NM_153636	NM_170684
RefSeq (protein)	NP_055242; NP_705900	NP_733785
Location (UCSC)	Chr 16: 89.58 – 89.6 Mb	Chr 8: 123.84 – 123.86 Mb
PubMed search
- Wikidata
View/Edit Human	View/Edit Mouse

Copine 7 is a protein that in humans is encoded by the CPNE7 gene.

== Function ==
This gene encodes a member of the copine family, which is composed of calcium-dependent membrane-binding proteins. The gene product contains two N-terminal C2 domains and one von Willebrand factor A domain. The encoded protein may be involved in membrane trafficking. Two alternatively spliced transcript variants encoding different isoforms have been found for this gene.
