= RASAL2 =

Protein-coding gene in humans

Identifiers
- Aliases: RASAL2, NGAP, RAS protein activator like 2
- External IDs: OMIM: 606136; MGI: 2443881; GeneCards: RASAL2

Gene location (Human)
Chr.	Chromosome 1 (human)
Band	1q25.2	Start	178,094,104 bp
Band	1q25.2	End	178,484,147 bp

Gene location (Mouse)
Chr.	Chromosome 1 (mouse)
Band	1|1 H1	Start	156,962,752 bp
Band	1|1 H1	End	157,240,165 bp
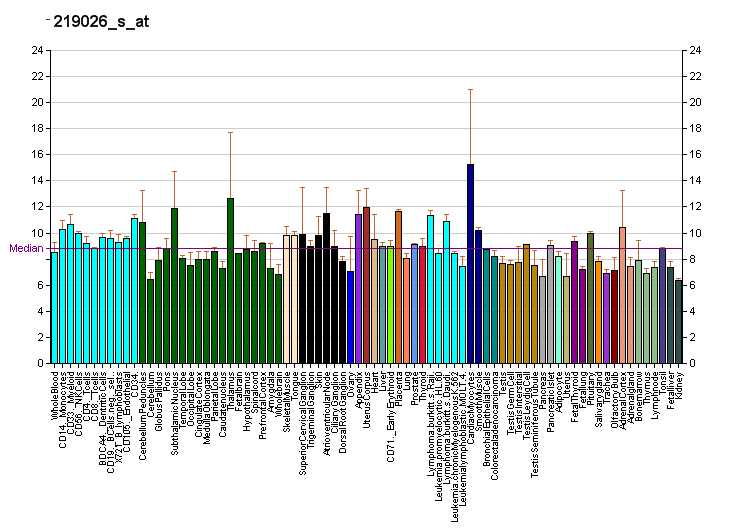
RNA expression pattern
Bgee	Human / Mouse (ortholog); Top expressed in: buccal mucosa cell; amniotic fluid; right ventricle; oral cavity; middle temporal gyrus; saphenous vein; sural nerve; Brodmann area 23; mucosa of paranasal sinus; tendon of biceps brachii / Top expressed in: sciatic nerve; utricle; primary motor cortex; cingulate gyrus; trigeminal ganglion; lateral septal nucleus; piriform cortex; temporal lobe; anterior amygdaloid area; prefrontal cortex; More reference expression data
BioGPS	More reference expression data
Gene ontology
Molecular function	protein binding; GTPase activator activity
Cellular component	cytoplasm; cytosol; intrinsic component of the cytoplasmic side of the plasma membrane
Biological process	negative regulation of Ras protein signal transduction; regulation of GTPase activity; signal transduction; MAPK cascade; positive regulation of GTPase activity
Sources:Amigo / QuickGO
Orthologs
Databases	NCBI: entry; OMA: entry
Species	Human	Mouse
Entrez	9462	226525
Ensembl	ENSG00000075391	ENSMUSG00000070565
UniProt	Q9UJF2	n/a
RefSeq (mRNA)	NM_004841; NM_170692	NM_177644; NM_001401202
RefSeq (protein)	NP_004832; NP_733793	n/a
Location (UCSC)	Chr 1: 178.09 – 178.48 Mb	Chr 1: 156.96 – 157.24 Mb
PubMed search
- Wikidata
View/Edit Human	View/Edit Mouse

Ras GTPase-activating protein nGAP is an enzyme that in humans is encoded by the RASAL2 gene.

This gene encodes a protein that contains the GAP-related domain (GRD), a characteristic domain of GTPase-activating proteins (GAPs). GAPs function as activators of Ras superfamily of small GTPases. The protein encoded by this gene is able to complement the defective RasGAP function in a yeast system. Two alternatively spliced transcript variants of this gene encoding distinct isoforms have been reported.
