= Multiple C2 domains, transmembrane 2 =

Protein-coding gene in the species Homo sapiens

MCTP2
Available structures
PDB	Ortholog search: PDBe RCSB
PDB	List of PDB id codes 2EP6

Identifiers
- Aliases: MCTP2, multiple C2 and transmembrane domain containing 2
- External IDs: OMIM: 616297; MGI: 2685335; HomoloGene: 69254; GeneCards: MCTP2; OMA:MCTP2 - orthologs

Gene location (Human)
Chr.	Chromosome 15 (human)
Band	15q26.2	Start	94,231,538 bp
Band	15q26.2	End	94,483,952 bp

Gene location (Mouse)
Chr.	Chromosome 7 (mouse)
Band	7|7 D1	Start	71,727,578 bp
Band	7|7 D1	End	71,956,356 bp
RNA expression pattern
Bgee	Human / Mouse (ortholog); Top expressed in: germinal epithelium; secondary oocyte; buccal mucosa cell; blood; visceral pleura; parietal pleura; spleen; bone marrow; bone marrow cell; mucosa of sigmoid colon / Top expressed in: secondary oocyte; zygote; primary oocyte; granulocyte; lumbar spinal ganglion; lacrimal gland; Paneth cell; left lobe of liver; submandibular gland; blood; More reference expression data
BioGPS	n/a
Gene ontology
Molecular function	calcium-dependent phospholipid binding; calcium ion binding
Cellular component	integral component of membrane; endoplasmic reticulum; membrane; nucleoplasm; cytosol; synaptic vesicle membrane
Biological process	multicellular organism development; calcium-mediated signaling
Sources:Amigo / QuickGO
Orthologs
Species	Human	Mouse
Entrez	55784	244049
Ensembl	ENSG00000140563	ENSMUSG00000032776
UniProt	Q6DN12	Q5RJH2
RefSeq (mRNA)	NM_001159643; NM_001159644; NM_018349	NM_001024703
RefSeq (protein)	NP_001153115; NP_001153116; NP_060819	NP_001019874
Location (UCSC)	Chr 15: 94.23 – 94.48 Mb	Chr 7: 71.73 – 71.96 Mb
PubMed search
- Wikidata
View/Edit Human	View/Edit Mouse

Multiple C2 domains, transmembrane 2 is a protein that in humans is encoded by the MCTP2 gene.
