= Extended synaptotagmin-2 =

Protein-coding gene in the species Homo sapiens

ESYT2
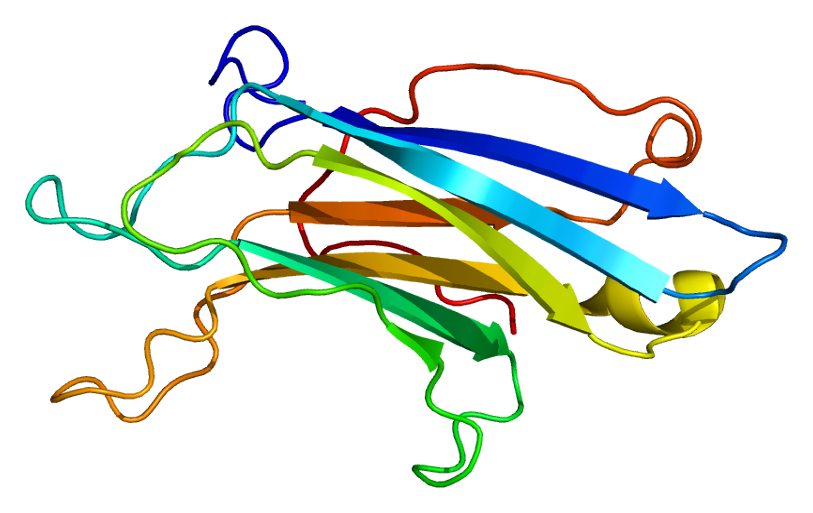

Identifiers
- Aliases: ESYT2, CHR2SYT, E-Syt2, FAM62B, extended synaptotagmin protein 2, extended synaptotagmin 2
- External IDs: OMIM: 616691; MGI: 1261845; GeneCards: ESYT2
Available structures
PDB	Ortholog search: PDBe RCSB
PDB	List of PDB id codes 2DMG, 4NPJ, 4NPK, 4P42

Gene location (Human)
Chr.	Chromosome 7 (human)
Band	7q36.3	Start	158,730,995 bp
Band	7q36.3	End	158,830,253 bp

Gene location (Mouse)
Chr.	Chromosome 12 (mouse)
Band	12 F2|12 62.65 cM	Start	116,244,816 bp
Band	12 F2|12 62.65 cM	End	116,354,670 bp
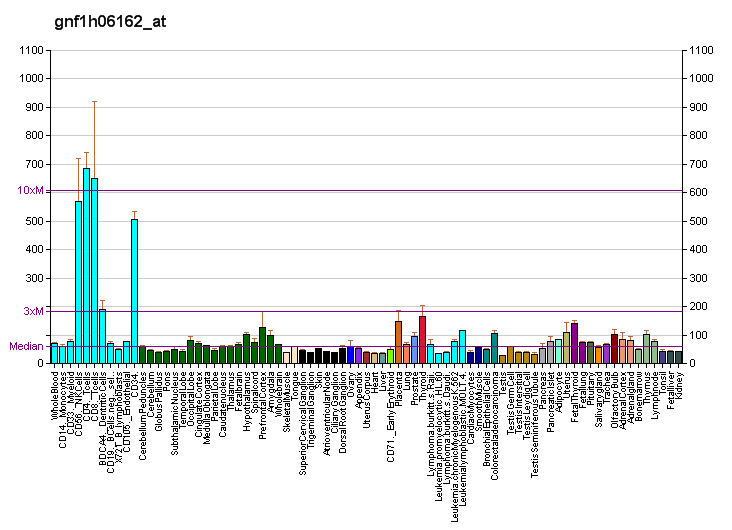
RNA expression pattern
Bgee	Human / Mouse (ortholog); Top expressed in: synovial membrane; Achilles tendon; saphenous vein; synovial joint; endothelial cell; urethra; cardiac muscle tissue of right atrium; myocardium of left ventricle; skin of arm; skin of hip / Top expressed in: interventricular septum; decidua; uterus; umbilical cord; ascending aorta; superior cervical ganglion; secondary oocyte; cervix; granulocyte; gastrula; More reference expression data
BioGPS	More reference expression data
Gene ontology
Molecular function	calcium-dependent phospholipid binding; calcium ion binding; protein binding; metal ion binding; phosphatidylinositol binding; phosphatidylethanolamine binding; phosphatidylcholine binding; identical protein binding; lipid binding; cadherin binding
Cellular component	intrinsic component of endoplasmic reticulum membrane; organelle membrane contact site; integral component of membrane; extrinsic component of cytoplasmic side of plasma membrane; plasma membrane; integral component of plasma membrane; membrane; endoplasmic reticulum; endoplasmic reticulum membrane; endoplasmic reticulum-plasma membrane contact site
Biological process	lipid transport; endocytosis; glycosphingolipid metabolic process; transport; endoplasmic reticulum-plasma membrane tethering
Sources:Amigo / QuickGO
Orthologs
Databases	NCBI: entry; OMA: entry
Species	Human	Mouse
Entrez	57488	52635
Ensembl	ENSG00000117868	ENSMUSG00000021171
UniProt	A0FGR8	Q3TZZ7
RefSeq (mRNA)	NM_020728	NM_028731
RefSeq (protein)	NP_065779; NP_001354702	NP_083007
Location (UCSC)	Chr 7: 158.73 – 158.83 Mb	Chr 12: 116.24 – 116.35 Mb
PubMed search
- Wikidata
View/Edit Human	View/Edit Mouse

Extended synaptotagmin-2 is a protein that in humans is encoded by the ESYT2 gene.
