= Regulating synaptic membrane exocytosis 3 =

Protein found in humans

RIMS3

Identifiers
- Aliases: RIMS3, NIM3, RIM3, regulating synaptic membrane exocytosis 3, RIM 3
- External IDs: OMIM: 611600; MGI: 2443331; GeneCards: RIMS3

Gene location (Human)
Chr.	Chromosome 1 (human)
Band	1p34.2	Start	40,620,680 bp
Band	1p34.2	End	40,665,682 bp

Gene location (Mouse)
Chr.	Chromosome 4 (mouse)
Band	4|4 D2.1	Start	120,712,013 bp
Band	4|4 D2.1	End	120,753,776 bp
RNA expression pattern
Bgee	Human / Mouse (ortholog); Top expressed in: middle temporal gyrus; lateral nuclear group of thalamus; Brodmann area 23; Brodmann area 46; superior frontal gyrus; orbitofrontal cortex; Brodmann area 10; frontal pole; postcentral gyrus; primary visual cortex / Top expressed in: medial dorsal nucleus; medial geniculate nucleus; superior colliculus; lateral geniculate nucleus; dorsomedial hypothalamic nucleus; paraventricular nucleus of hypothalamus; suprachiasmatic nucleus; ventral tegmental area; lateral hypothalamus; inferior colliculi; More reference expression data
BioGPS	n/a
Gene ontology
Molecular function	transmembrane transporter binding
Cellular component	presynaptic active zone; cell junction; synapse; membrane; presynaptic membrane; cytoskeleton of presynaptic active zone; presynaptic active zone cytoplasmic component
Biological process	neurotransmitter transport; calcium-ion regulated exocytosis; exocytosis; regulation of membrane potential; calcium ion-regulated exocytosis of neurotransmitter; regulation of synaptic vesicle exocytosis; regulation of synaptic plasticity; positive regulation of synaptic transmission
Sources:Amigo / QuickGO
Orthologs
Databases	NCBI: entry; OMA: entry
Species	Human	Mouse
Entrez	9783	242662
Ensembl	ENSG00000117016	ENSMUSG00000032890
UniProt	Q9UJD0	Q80U57
RefSeq (mRNA)	NM_014747	NM_182929
RefSeq (protein)	NP_055562	NP_891559
Location (UCSC)	Chr 1: 40.62 – 40.67 Mb	Chr 4: 120.71 – 120.75 Mb
PubMed search
- Wikidata
View/Edit Human	View/Edit Mouse

Regulating synaptic membrane exocytosis 3 is a protein that in humans is encoded by the RIMS3 gene.
