= RASA4 =

Protein-coding gene in the species Homo sapiens

Identifiers
- Aliases: RASA4, CAPRI, GAPL, RAS p21 protein activator 4
- External IDs: OMIM: 607943; MGI: 1858600; GeneCards: RASA4

Gene location (Human)
Chr.	Chromosome 7 (human)
Band	7q22.1	Start	102,579,646 bp
Band	7q22.1	End	102,616,756 bp

Gene location (Mouse)
Chr.	Chromosome 5 (mouse)
Band	5|5 G2	Start	136,083,916 bp
Band	5|5 G2	End	136,111,860 bp
RNA expression pattern
Bgee	Human / Mouse (ortholog); Top expressed in: muscle of thigh; gastrocnemius muscle; skeletal muscle tissue; sural nerve; right coronary artery; granulocyte; myometrium; body of uterus; subcutaneous adipose tissue; canal of the cervix / Top expressed in: primary oocyte; Ileal epithelium; zygote; muscle of thigh; secondary oocyte; plantaris muscle; neural layer of retina; extensor digitorum longus muscle; stroma of bone marrow; ankle joint; More reference expression data
BioGPS	n/a
Gene ontology
Molecular function	GTPase activator activity; metal ion binding; phospholipid binding
Cellular component	cytoplasm; cytosol; membrane; intrinsic component of the cytoplasmic side of the plasma membrane; plasma membrane
Biological process	intracellular signal transduction; regulation of GTPase activity; MAPK cascade; negative regulation of GTPase activity; signal transduction; positive regulation of GTPase activity; negative regulation of Ras protein signal transduction; cellular response to calcium ion
Sources:Amigo / QuickGO
Orthologs
Databases	NCBI: entry; OMA: entry
Species	Human	Mouse
Entrez	10156	54153
Ensembl	ENSG00000105808	ENSMUSG00000004952
UniProt	O43374	Q6PFQ7
RefSeq (mRNA)	NM_001079877; NM_006989	NM_001039103; NM_133914
RefSeq (protein)	NP_001073346; NP_008920	NP_001034192; NP_598675
Location (UCSC)	Chr 7: 102.58 – 102.62 Mb	Chr 5: 136.08 – 136.11 Mb
PubMed search
- Wikidata
View/Edit Human	View/Edit Mouse

Ras GTPase-activating protein 4 is an enzyme that in humans is encoded by the RASA4 gene.

This gene encodes a member of the GAP1 family of GTPase-activating proteins that suppresses the Ras/mitogen-activated protein kinase pathway in response to Ca(2+). Stimuli that increase intracellular Ca(2+) levels result in the translocation of this protein to the plasma membrane, where it activates as GTPase activity. Consequently, Ras is converted from the active GTP-bound state to the inactive GDP-bound state and no longer activates downstream pathways that regulate gene expression, cell growth, and differentiation. Multiple transcript variants encoding different isoforms have been found for this gene.
