= SYT2 =

Protein-coding gene in humans

Identifiers
- Aliases: SYT2, SytII, CMS7, MYSPC, synaptotagmin 2, CMS7A, CMS7B
- External IDs: OMIM: 600104; MGI: 99666; GeneCards: SYT2

Gene location (Human)
Chr.	Chromosome 1 (human)
Band	1q32.1	Start	202,590,596 bp
Band	1q32.1	End	202,710,454 bp

Gene location (Mouse)
Chr.	Chromosome 1 (mouse)
Band	1 E4|1 58.24 cM	Start	134,574,415 bp
Band	1 E4|1 58.24 cM	End	134,690,331 bp
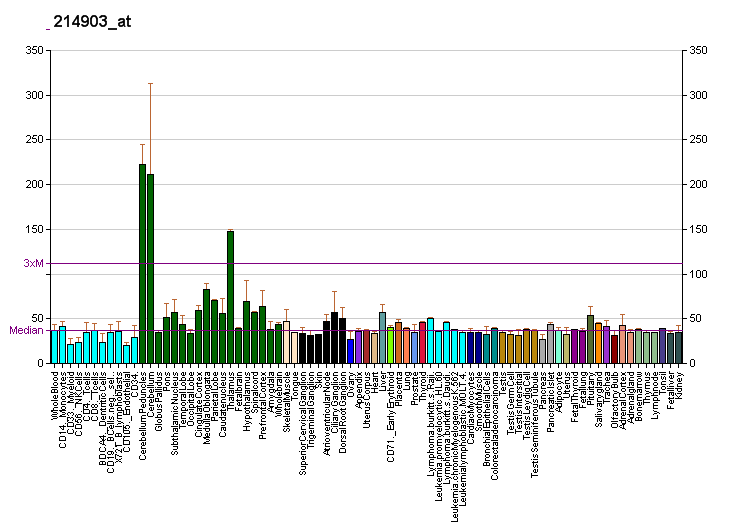
RNA expression pattern
Bgee	Human / Mouse (ortholog); Top expressed in: pons; external globus pallidus; paraflocculus of cerebellum; cerebellar vermis; lateral nuclear group of thalamus; right hemisphere of cerebellum; superior vestibular nucleus; pars compacta; dorsal motor nucleus of vagus nerve; pars reticulata / Top expressed in: cerebellar cortex; inferior colliculi; medulla oblongata; deep cerebellar nuclei; pontine nuclei; medial vestibular nucleus; facial motor nucleus; anterior horn of spinal cord; cerebellar vermis; lobe of cerebellum; More reference expression data
BioGPS	More reference expression data
Gene ontology
Molecular function	metal ion binding; calcium ion binding; inositol 1,3,4,5 tetrakisphosphate binding; clathrin binding; syntaxin binding; protein binding; calcium-dependent phospholipid binding; SNARE binding; phosphatidylserine binding
Cellular component	cell junction; chromaffin granule membrane; synaptic vesicle; membrane; cytoplasmic vesicle; synapse; integral component of membrane; synaptic vesicle membrane; plasma membrane; clathrin-coated vesicle membrane; axon; dense core granule; exocytic vesicle
Biological process	synaptic vesicle endocytosis; cell differentiation; neurotransmitter secretion; positive regulation of dendrite extension; vesicle fusion; regulation of calcium ion-dependent exocytosis; calcium ion-regulated exocytosis of neurotransmitter; membrane organization; regulation of dopamine secretion; synaptic vesicle exocytosis; vesicle-mediated transport; calcium-ion regulated exocytosis; cellular response to calcium ion
Sources:Amigo / QuickGO
Orthologs
Databases	NCBI: entry; OMA: entry
Species	Human	Mouse
Entrez	127833	20980
Ensembl	ENSG00000143858	ENSMUSG00000026452
UniProt	Q8N9I0	P46097
RefSeq (mRNA)	NM_001136504; NM_177402	NM_009307; NM_001355726
RefSeq (protein)	NP_001129976; NP_796376	NP_033333; NP_001342655
Location (UCSC)	Chr 1: 202.59 – 202.71 Mb	Chr 1: 134.57 – 134.69 Mb
PubMed search
- Wikidata
View/Edit Human	View/Edit Mouse

Synaptotagmin-2 is a protein that in humans is encoded by the SYT2 gene.
