= RGS3 =

Protein-coding gene in the species Homo sapiens

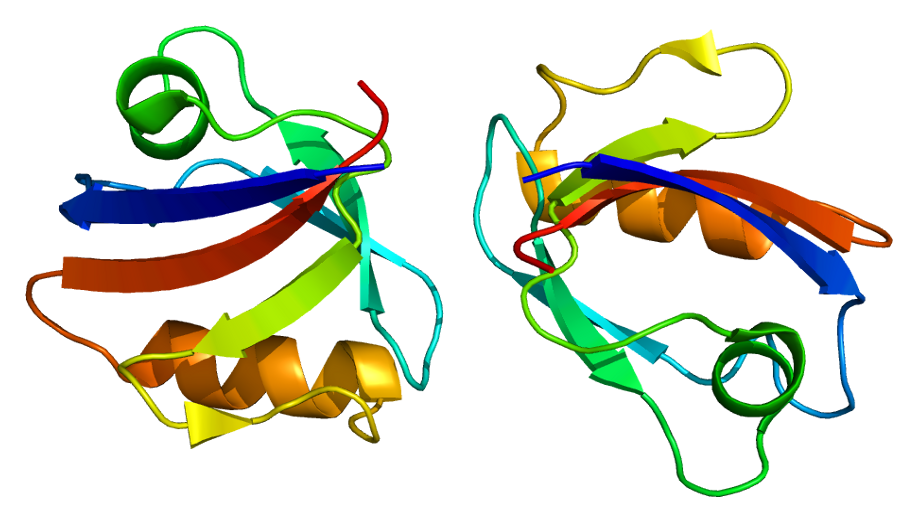

Identifiers
- Aliases: RGS3, C2PA, RGP3, regulator of G-protein signaling 3, regulator of G protein signaling 3
- External IDs: OMIM: 602189; MGI: 1354734; GeneCards: RGS3
Available structures
PDB	Ortholog search: PDBe RCSB
PDB	List of PDB id codes 2F5Y, 2OJ4, 3FBK

Gene location (Human)
Chr.	Chromosome 9 (human)
Band	9q32	Start	113,444,731 bp
Band	9q32	End	113,597,743 bp

Gene location (Mouse)
Chr.	Chromosome 4 (mouse)
Band	4 B3|4 33.19 cM	Start	62,478,084 bp
Band	4 B3|4 33.19 cM	End	62,622,238 bp
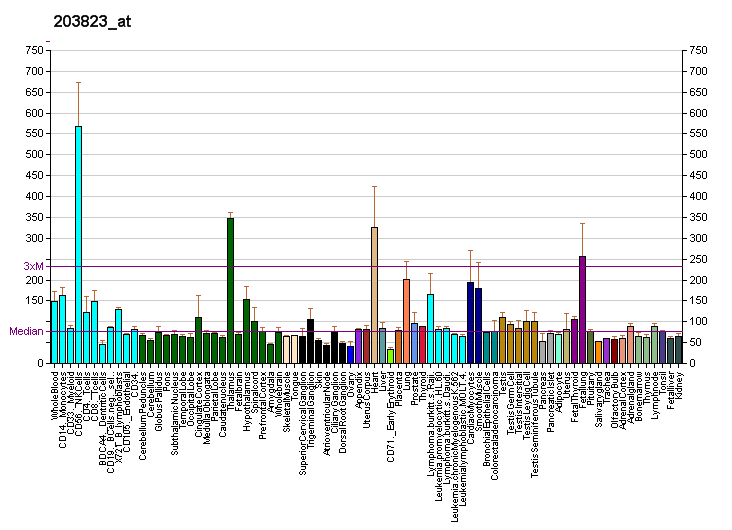

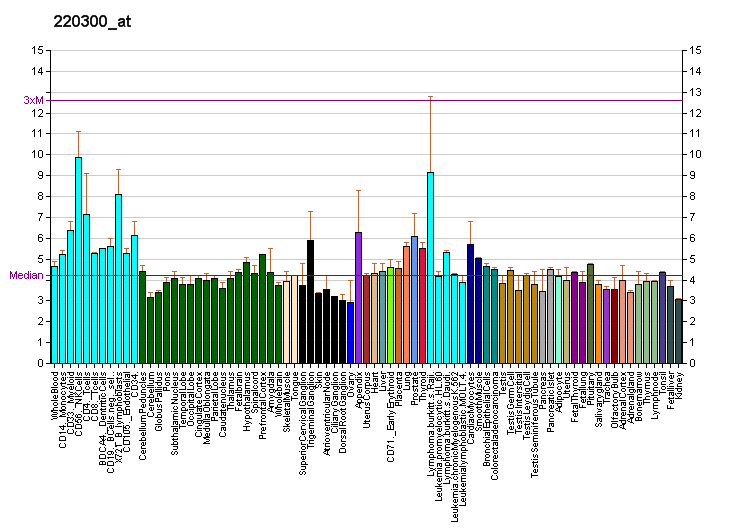
RNA expression pattern
Bgee	Human / Mouse (ortholog); Top expressed in: apex of heart; cartilage tissue; periodontal fiber; ascending aorta; Descending thoracic aorta; left ventricle; gallbladder; right auricle of heart; lateral nuclear group of thalamus; granulocyte / Top expressed in: zygote; granulocyte; ventricular zone; genital tubercle; secondary oocyte; external carotid artery; internal carotid artery; spermatid; yolk sac; neural layer of retina; More reference expression data
BioGPS	More reference expression data
Gene ontology
Molecular function	protein binding; GTPase activator activity; GTPase activity
Cellular component	plasma membrane; membrane; nucleus; nucleoplasm; cytosol; cytoplasm
Biological process	negative regulation of signal transduction; regulation of G protein-coupled receptor signaling pathway; positive regulation of GTPase activity; G protein-coupled receptor signaling pathway
Sources:Amigo / QuickGO
Orthologs
Databases	NCBI: entry; OMA: entry
Species	Human	Mouse
Entrez	5998	50780
Ensembl	ENSG00000138835	ENSMUSG00000059810
UniProt	P49796	Q9DC04
RefSeq (mRNA)	NM_001276260; NM_001276261; NM_001276262; NM_001282922; NM_001282923 NM_017790; NM_130795; NM_134427; NM_144488; NM_144489; NM_001322214; NM_001322215; NM_001351526; NM_001394167	NM_001081650; NM_019492; NM_134257; NM_001310706
RefSeq (protein)	NP_001263189; NP_001263190; NP_001263191; NP_001269851; NP_001269852 NP_001309143; NP_001309144; NP_060260; NP_570613; NP_602299; NP_652759; NP_652760; NP_001338455; NP_001263189.1; NP_001269851.1	NP_001075119; NP_001297635; NP_062365; NP_599018
Location (UCSC)	Chr 9: 113.44 – 113.6 Mb	Chr 4: 62.48 – 62.62 Mb
PubMed search
- Wikidata
View/Edit Human	View/Edit Mouse

Regulator of G-protein signaling 3 is a protein that in humans is encoded by the RGS3 gene.

This gene encodes a member of the regulator of G-protein signaling (RGS) family. This protein is a GTP-ase activating protein which inhibits G-protein mediated signal transduction. The protein is largely cytosolic, but G-protein activation leads to translocation of this protein to the plasma membrane. A nuclear form of this protein has also been described, but its sequence has not been identified. Multiple alternatively spliced transcript variants have been described for this gene but the full-length nature of some transcripts is not yet known.
