= CPNE4 =

Protein-coding gene in humans

Identifiers
- Aliases: CPNE4, COPN4, CPN4, copine 4
- External IDs: OMIM: 604208; MGI: 1921270; GeneCards: CPNE4

Gene location (Human)
Chr.	Chromosome 3 (human)
Band	3q22.1	Start	131,533,555 bp
Band	3q22.1	End	132,285,410 bp

Gene location (Mouse)
Chr.	Chromosome 9 (mouse)
Band	9|9 F1	Start	104,424,485 bp
Band	9|9 F1	End	104,911,743 bp
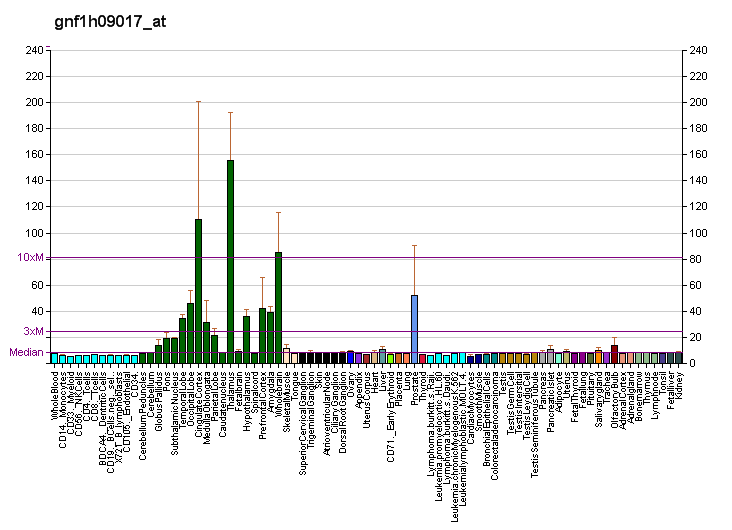
RNA expression pattern
Bgee	Human / Mouse (ortholog); Top expressed in: lateral nuclear group of thalamus; myocardium of left ventricle; endothelial cell; primary visual cortex; Brodmann area 23; palpebral conjunctiva; dorsolateral prefrontal cortex; Brodmann area 9; Brodmann area 46; right ventricle / Top expressed in: dentate gyrus of hippocampal formation granule cell; lumbar spinal ganglion; hippocampus proper; trigeminal ganglion; primary visual cortex; habenula; superior frontal gyrus; olfactory bulb; temporal lobe; glossopharyngeal ganglion; More reference expression data
BioGPS	More reference expression data
Gene ontology
Molecular function	protein binding; calcium-dependent phospholipid binding
Cellular component	extracellular exosome; plasma membrane
Biological process	cellular response to calcium ion
Sources:Amigo / QuickGO
Orthologs
Databases	NCBI: entry; OMA: entry
Species	Human	Mouse
Entrez	131034	74020
Ensembl	ENSG00000196353	ENSMUSG00000032564
UniProt	Q96A23; Q4G168	Q8BLR2
RefSeq (mRNA)	NM_001289112; NM_130808; NM_153429; NM_001388326; NM_001388327	NM_028719; NM_001357439; NM_001378996
RefSeq (protein)	NP_001276041; NP_570720; NP_702907; NP_001276041.1; NP_570720.1 NP_702907.1	NP_082995; NP_001344368; NP_001365925
Location (UCSC)	Chr 3: 131.53 – 132.29 Mb	Chr 9: 104.42 – 104.91 Mb
PubMed search
- Wikidata
View/Edit Human	View/Edit Mouse

Copine-4 is a protein that in humans is encoded by the CPNE4 gene.

Calcium-dependent membrane-binding proteins may regulate molecular events at the interface of the cell membrane and cytoplasm.

This gene is one of several genes that encode a calcium-dependent protein containing two N-terminal type II C2 domains and an integrin A domain-like sequence in the C-terminus.
