= SYT6 =

Protein-coding gene in humans

Identifiers
- Aliases: SYT6, sytVI, synaptotagmin 6
- External IDs: OMIM: 607718; MGI: 1859544; GeneCards: SYT6

Gene location (Human)
Chr.	Chromosome 1 (human)
Band	1p13.2	Start	114,089,291 bp
Band	1p13.2	End	114,153,880 bp

Gene location (Mouse)
Chr.	Chromosome 3 (mouse)
Band	3|3 F2.2	Start	103,482,547 bp
Band	3|3 F2.2	End	103,552,885 bp
RNA expression pattern
Bgee	Human / Mouse (ortholog); Top expressed in: pancreatic ductal cell; ganglionic eminence; nucleus accumbens; hypothalamus; tibialis anterior muscle; caudate nucleus; primary visual cortex; putamen; mucosa of ileum; prefrontal cortex / Top expressed in: multiform layer of neocortex; superior frontal gyrus; olfactory bulb; pretectal area; Rostral migratory stream; primary visual cortex; lumbar spinal ganglion; olfactory tubercle; dentate gyrus of hippocampal formation granule cell; embryo; More reference expression data
BioGPS	n/a
Gene ontology
Molecular function	calcium ion binding; protein homodimerization activity; clathrin binding; calcium-dependent protein binding; metal ion binding; protein binding; identical protein binding; calcium-dependent phospholipid binding; syntaxin binding; phosphatidylserine binding; SNARE binding
Cellular component	cytoplasm; integral component of membrane; cytosol; membrane; perinuclear endoplasmic reticulum; synapse; synaptic vesicle membrane; cell junction; cytoplasmic vesicle; plasma membrane; extrinsic component of membrane; glutamatergic synapse; integral component of synaptic membrane; exocytic vesicle
Biological process	acrosomal vesicle exocytosis; acrosome reaction; regulation of calcium ion-dependent exocytosis; calcium ion-regulated exocytosis of neurotransmitter; vesicle fusion; presynaptic dense core vesicle exocytosis; regulation of dopamine secretion; synaptic vesicle exocytosis; vesicle-mediated transport; calcium-ion regulated exocytosis; cellular response to calcium ion
Sources:Amigo / QuickGO
Orthologs
Databases	NCBI: entry; OMA: entry
Species	Human	Mouse
Entrez	148281	54524
Ensembl	ENSG00000134207	ENSMUSG00000027849
UniProt	Q5T7P8	Q9R0N8
RefSeq (mRNA)	NM_001253772; NM_001270805; NM_205848; NM_001366223; NM_001366224 NM_001366225; NM_001366226	NM_001276676; NM_001276677; NM_001276679; NM_001276680; NM_001276681 NM_018800
RefSeq (protein)	NP_001257734; NP_995320; NP_001240701; NP_001353152; NP_001353153 NP_001353154; NP_001353155	NP_001263605; NP_001263606; NP_001263608; NP_001263609; NP_001263610 NP_061270
Location (UCSC)	Chr 1: 114.09 – 114.15 Mb	Chr 3: 103.48 – 103.55 Mb
PubMed search
- Wikidata
View/Edit Human	View/Edit Mouse

Synaptotagmin-6 is a protein that in humans is encoded by the SYT6 gene.

== Function ==
Synaptotagmins, such as SYT6, share a common domain structure that includes a transmembrane domain and a cytoplasmic region composed of 2 C2 domains. Some synaptotagmins are involved in synaptic membrane fusion, while others have a more general function in endocytosis. For further information on synaptotagmins, see MIM 185605.[supplied by OMIM]
