= SYT3 =

Protein-coding gene in the species Homo sapiens

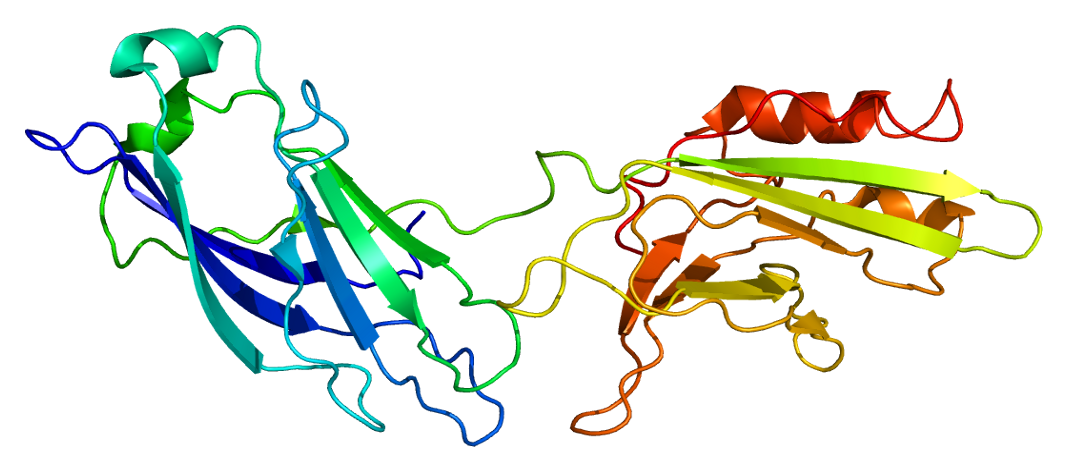

Identifiers
- Aliases: SYT3, SytIII, synaptotagmin 3
- External IDs: OMIM: 600327; MGI: 99665; GeneCards: SYT3

Gene location (Human)
| Chr. | Chromosome 19 (human) |
| Band | 19q13.33 | Start | 50,621,307 bp |
| Band | 19q13.33 | End | 50,639,881 bp |

Gene location (Mouse)
| Chr. | Chromosome 7 (mouse) |
| Band | 7 B3|7 28.83 cM | Start | 44,033,526 bp |
| Band | 7 B3|7 28.83 cM | End | 44,049,611 bp |
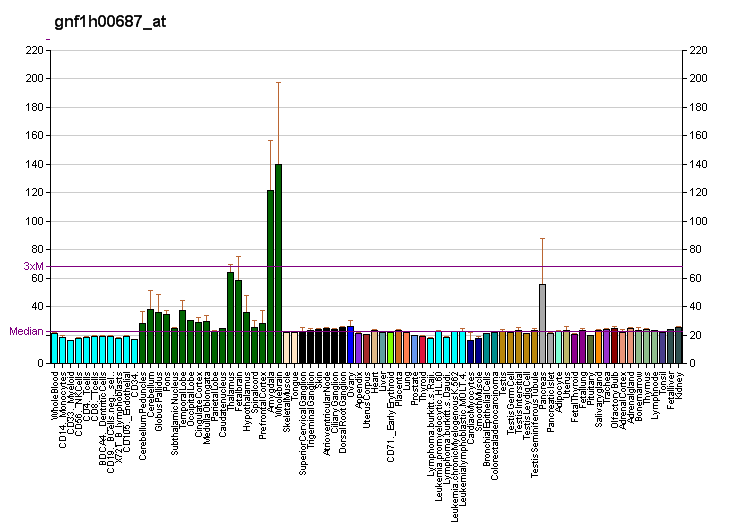

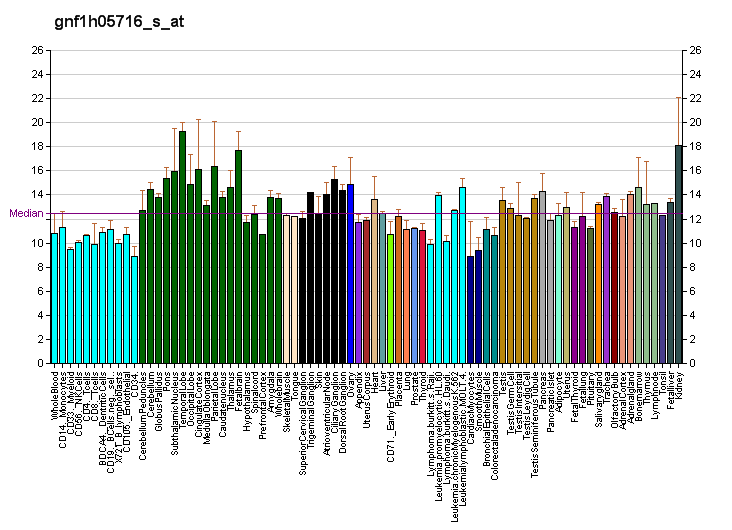
RNA expression pattern
| Bgee | Human / Mouse (ortholog); Top expressed in: primary visual cortex; superior frontal gyrus; right hemisphere of cerebellum; prefrontal cortex; Brodmann area 9; right frontal lobe; anterior cingulate cortex; hippocampus proper; gonad; hypothalamus / Top expressed in: primary visual cortex; superior frontal gyrus; dentate gyrus of hippocampal formation granule cell; CA3 field; perirhinal cortex; cerebellar cortex; neural layer of retina; Ileal epithelium; entorhinal cortex; lumbar subsegment of spinal cord; More reference expression data |
| BioGPS | More reference expression data |
Gene ontology
| Molecular function | clathrin binding; calcium ion binding; metal ion binding; calcium-dependent phospholipid binding; syntaxin binding; SNARE binding; phosphatidylserine binding |
| Cellular component | integral component of membrane; endosome; transport vesicle membrane; membrane; cytoplasmic vesicle; presynapse; plasma membrane; synapse; exocytic vesicle |
| Biological process | positive regulation of dendrite extension; cell differentiation; calcium-ion regulated exocytosis; calcium ion-regulated exocytosis of neurotransmitter; regulation of calcium ion-dependent exocytosis; vesicle fusion; regulation of dopamine secretion; synaptic vesicle exocytosis; vesicle-mediated transport; cellular response to calcium ion |
Sources:Amigo / QuickGO
Orthologs
| Databases | NCBI: entry; OMA: entry |
| Species | Human | Mouse |
| Entrez | 84258 | 20981 |
| Ensembl | ENSG00000213023 | ENSMUSG00000030731 |
| UniProt | Q9BQG1 | O35681 |
| RefSeq (mRNA) | NM_001160328; NM_001160329; NM_032298 | NM_001114116; NM_016663 |
| RefSeq (protein) | NP_001153800; NP_001153801; NP_115674; NP_001153800.1; NP_001153801.1 NP_115674.1 | NP_001107588; NP_057872 |
| Location (UCSC) | Chr 19: 50.62 – 50.64 Mb | Chr 7: 44.03 – 44.05 Mb |
| PubMed search |
- Wikidata
| View/Edit Human | View/Edit Mouse |

Synaptotagmin-3 is a protein that in humans is encoded by the SYT3 gene.
