= SYT5 =

Protein-coding gene in the species Homo sapiens

Identifiers
- Aliases: SYT5, synaptotagmin 5
- External IDs: OMIM: 600782; MGI: 1926368; GeneCards: SYT5

Gene location (Human)
Chr.	Chromosome 19 (human)
Band	19q13.42|11p	Start	55,171,196 bp
Band	19q13.42|11p	End	55,180,289 bp

Gene location (Mouse)
Chr.	Chromosome 7 (mouse)
Band	7|7 A1	Start	4,542,764 bp
Band	7|7 A1	End	4,550,540 bp
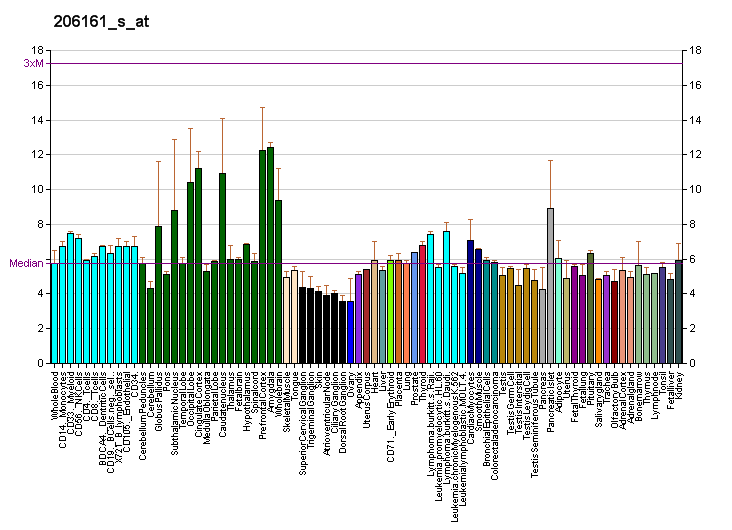

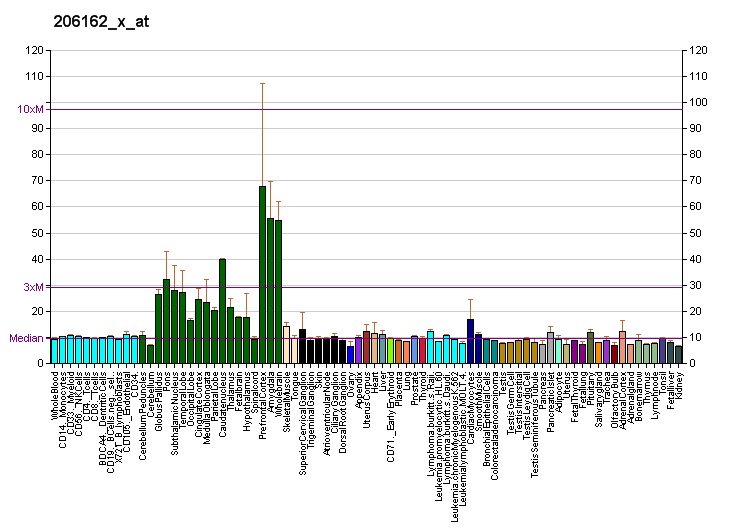
RNA expression pattern
Bgee	Human / Mouse (ortholog); Top expressed in: prefrontal cortex; right frontal lobe; cingulate gyrus; anterior cingulate cortex; nucleus accumbens; caudate nucleus; dorsolateral prefrontal cortex; Brodmann area 9; putamen; Brodmann area 10 / Top expressed in: superior frontal gyrus; primary visual cortex; entorhinal cortex; dentate gyrus of hippocampal formation granule cell; perirhinal cortex; CA3 field; tongue; anterior amygdaloid area; ventromedial nucleus; lateral septal nucleus; More reference expression data
BioGPS	More reference expression data
Gene ontology
Molecular function	clathrin binding; metal ion binding; protein heterodimerization activity; calcium-dependent phospholipid binding; syntaxin binding; SNARE binding; phosphatidylinositol-4,5-bisphosphate binding; phosphatidylserine binding; calcium ion binding
Cellular component	integral component of membrane; endosome; membrane; synapse; synaptic vesicle membrane; cell junction; soma; recycling endosome membrane; perinuclear region of cytoplasm; neuron projection; dense core granule; cytoplasmic vesicle; plasma membrane; proximal neuron projection; integral component of neuronal dense core vesicle membrane; axon; exocytic vesicle
Biological process	synaptic vesicle endocytosis; chemical synaptic transmission; vesicle fusion; regulation of calcium ion-dependent exocytosis; calcium ion-regulated exocytosis of neurotransmitter; regulation of dopamine secretion; synaptic vesicle exocytosis; vesicle-mediated transport; calcium-ion regulated exocytosis; cellular response to calcium ion
Sources:Amigo / QuickGO
Orthologs
Databases	NCBI: entry; OMA: entry
Species	Human	Mouse
Entrez	6861	53420
Ensembl	ENSG00000129990	ENSMUSG00000004961
UniProt	O00445	Q9R0N5
RefSeq (mRNA)	NM_001297774; NM_003180	NM_016908; NM_001360421; NM_001360422
RefSeq (protein)	NP_001284703; NP_003171	NP_001347350; NP_001347351
Location (UCSC)	Chr 19: 55.17 – 55.18 Mb	Chr 7: 4.54 – 4.55 Mb
PubMed search
- Wikidata
View/Edit Human	View/Edit Mouse

Synaptotagmin-5 is a protein that in humans is encoded by the SYT5 gene.
