= SYT13 =

Protein-coding gene in the species Homo sapiens

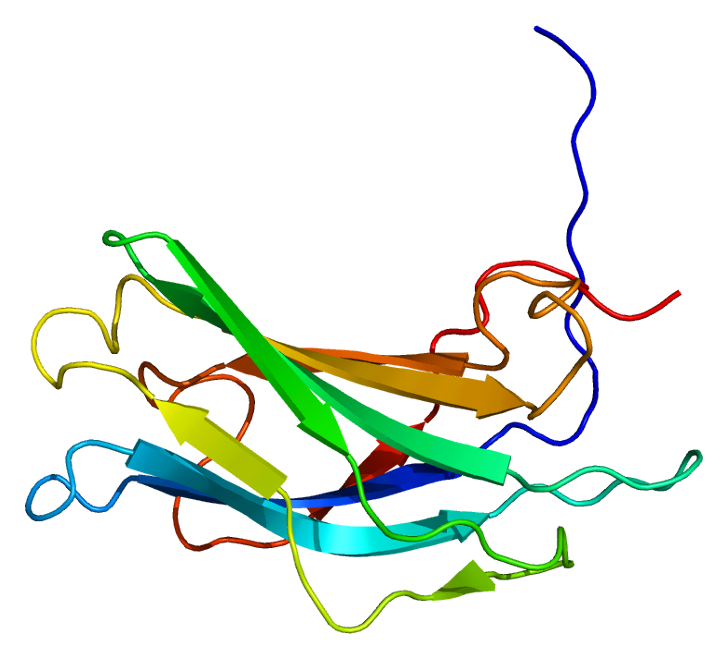

Identifiers
- Aliases: SYT13, synaptotagmin 13
- External IDs: OMIM: 607716; MGI: 1933945; GeneCards: SYT13
Available structures
PDB	Ortholog search: PDBe RCSB
PDB	List of PDB id codes 1WFM

Gene location (Human)
Chr.	Chromosome 11 (human)
Band	11p11.2	Start	45,240,302 bp
Band	11p11.2	End	45,286,341 bp

Gene location (Mouse)
Chr.	Chromosome 2 (mouse)
Band	2|2 E1	Start	92,745,443 bp
Band	2|2 E1	End	92,786,403 bp
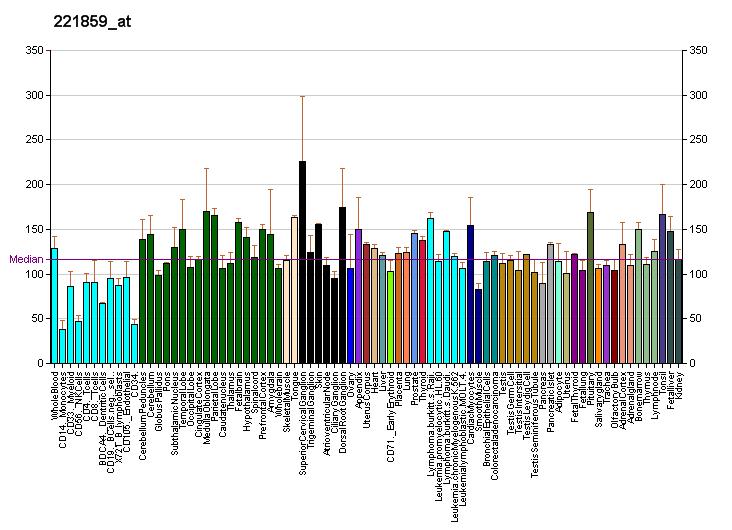
RNA expression pattern
Bgee	Human / Mouse (ortholog); Top expressed in: middle temporal gyrus; Brodmann area 23; endothelial cell; lateral nuclear group of thalamus; islet of Langerhans; pons; pars compacta; superior frontal gyrus; postcentral gyrus; entorhinal cortex / Top expressed in: islet of Langerhans; medial dorsal nucleus; habenula; dentate gyrus of hippocampal formation granule cell; visual cortex; dorsomedial hypothalamic nucleus; primary visual cortex; central gray substance of midbrain; medial geniculate nucleus; ventral tegmental area; More reference expression data
BioGPS	More reference expression data
Gene ontology
Molecular function	calcium-dependent phospholipid binding; clathrin binding; calcium ion binding; syntaxin binding; SNARE binding; phosphatidylserine binding
Cellular component	integral component of membrane; integral component of plasma membrane; transport vesicle; intracellular membrane-bounded organelle; membrane; plasma membrane; presynapse; synapse; exocytic vesicle
Biological process	vesicle-mediated transport; vesicle fusion; regulation of calcium ion-dependent exocytosis; calcium ion-regulated exocytosis of neurotransmitter; regulation of dopamine secretion; synaptic vesicle exocytosis; calcium-ion regulated exocytosis; cellular response to calcium ion
Sources:Amigo / QuickGO
Orthologs
Databases	NCBI: entry; OMA: entry
Species	Human	Mouse
Entrez	57586	80976
Ensembl	ENSG00000019505	ENSMUSG00000027220
UniProt	Q7L8C5	Q9EQT6
RefSeq (mRNA)	NM_020826; NM_001247987	NM_030725
RefSeq (protein)	NP_001234916; NP_065877	NP_109650
Location (UCSC)	Chr 11: 45.24 – 45.29 Mb	Chr 2: 92.75 – 92.79 Mb
PubMed search
- Wikidata
View/Edit Human	View/Edit Mouse

Synaptotagmin-13 is a protein that in humans is encoded by the SYT13 gene.

== Function ==
SYT13 belongs to the large synaptotagmin protein family. All synaptotagmins show type I membrane topology, with an extracellular N terminus, a single transmembrane region, and a cytoplasmic C terminus containing tandem C2 domains. Major functions of synaptotagmins include vesicular traffic, exocytosis, and secretion.[supplied by OMIM]
