= CPNE1 =

Protein-coding gene in humans

Identifiers
- Aliases: CPNE1, COPN1, CPN1, copine 1
- External IDs: OMIM: 604205; MGI: 2386621; GeneCards: CPNE1

Gene location (Human)
Chr.	Chromosome 20 (human)
Band	20q11.22	Start	35,626,031 bp
Band	20q11.22	End	35,664,956 bp

Gene location (Mouse)
Chr.	Chromosome 2 (mouse)
Band	2|2 H1	Start	155,913,762 bp
Band	2|2 H1	End	155,953,885 bp
RNA expression pattern
Bgee	Human / Mouse (ortholog); Top expressed in: granulocyte; canal of the cervix; right lobe of thyroid gland; anterior pituitary; left lobe of thyroid gland; right uterine tube; body of uterus; right ovary; left ovary; ectocervix / Top expressed in: granulocyte; yolk sac; thymus; uterus; lung; white adipose tissue; adrenal gland; spleen; placenta; cerebellum; More reference expression data
BioGPS	n/a
Gene ontology
Molecular function	calcium ion binding; protein homodimerization activity; transporter activity; endopeptidase activity; phosphatidylserine binding; NF-kappaB binding; protein binding; calcium-dependent phospholipid binding
Cellular component	cytoplasm; cytosol; membrane; plasma membrane; extracellular exosome; nucleus; nucleoplasm; nuclear membrane; azurophil granule membrane
Biological process	cellular response to calcium ion; cell differentiation; positive regulation of protein kinase B signaling; regulation of transcription, DNA-templated; lipid metabolism; positive regulation of tumor necrosis factor-mediated signaling pathway; negative regulation of DNA binding; negative regulation of gene expression; transcription, DNA-templated; proteolysis; neuron projection extension; negative regulation of NIK/NF-kappaB signaling; glycerophospholipid biosynthetic process; positive regulation of neuron differentiation; vesicle-mediated transport; regulation of I-kappaB kinase/NF-kappaB signaling; neutrophil degranulation
Sources:Amigo / QuickGO
Orthologs
Databases	NCBI: entry; OMA: entry
Species	Human	Mouse
Entrez	8904	266692
Ensembl	ENSG00000214078	ENSMUSG00000074643
UniProt	Q99829; Q5JX58	Q8C166
RefSeq (mRNA)	NM_001198863; NM_003915; NM_152925; NM_152926; NM_152927 NM_152928; NM_152930; NM_152931	NM_170588; NM_170590
RefSeq (protein)	NP_001185792; NP_003906; NP_690902; NP_690903; NP_690904 NP_690905	NP_733467; NP_733469
Location (UCSC)	Chr 20: 35.63 – 35.66 Mb	Chr 2: 155.91 – 155.95 Mb
PubMed search
- Wikidata
View/Edit Human	View/Edit Mouse

Copine-1 is a protein that in humans is encoded by the CPNE1 gene.

CPNE is a highly homologous protein first discovered in nematodes and plants. Nine CPNEs were originally discovered (CPNE1-9) and only 8 CPNEs were found in mammals (CPNE1-8). CPNE1-3 are the most widely distributed and are found in most mammalian tissues, this includes but is not limited to, the testis, kidney, brain, lung, heart, and intestine. (CPNE-1) was reported in 1998, where it was identified by isolating annexin in Paramecium.

CPNE-1 is a highly conserved Calcium-dependent membrane-binding proteins in different eukaryotes. In humans the CPNE1 gene encodes the calcium dependent, Copine-1 protein which has an integrin A domain and two N-terminal type II C2 domains. Where the C2 domains act as calcium dependent phospholipid binding motifs and can be included in cell signaling or membrane trafficking pathways. However, the encoded protein does not contain a predicted signal sequence or transmembrane domains. CPNE-1 may also regulate molecular events at the interface of the cell membrane and cytoplasm. This protein has a broad tissue distribution and it may function in membrane trafficking. This gene and the gene for RNA binding motif protein 12 overlap at map location 20q11.21. Sequence analysis identified multiple alternatively spliced variants in the 5' UTR. All variants encode the same protein.

== Roles of CPNE1 ==
CPNE1 has a general role in many biological processes, where it promotes the outgrowth of neurites by activating the AKT phosphorylation and plays an important role in the regulation of neural stem cell proliferation. New and old studies suggest that the important and dominant role of CPNE1 is in tumorigenesis and malignant progression.

CPNE1 can regulate molecular events at the interface of the cell membrane and cytoplasm. In brain cells, it is connected to the AKT signaling pathway, giving it importance in the neural stem cell functions in the course of brain development. Where it is detrimental in regulating the neural stem cell functions throughout the activation of the AKT-mTOR signaling pathway in the brain development phase. It has an important role in the central nervous system as a regulator for neuronal differentiation of HiB5 cells. It does this by activating the AKT signaling pathway by its interactions with JAB-1 and 14-4-3 gamma (Kim et al., 2018). (The AKT Signaling pathway is a signal transduction pathway that helps the growth and survival in response to extracellular signals).

In addition to this role, CPNE1 has an important role in the presence and growth of different cancer types. Individuals with prostate cancer show a higher CPNE1 expression and this expression is affiliated with the stage and prognosis of patients with prostate cancer. This happens mechanistically when CPNE1 interacts with TRAF-2 (regulates a variety of different physiological roles, from inflammatory responses and T and B signaling to organogenesis and cell survival) To promote the progression of cancer. In patients with osteosarcoma, CPNE1 has a role in increasing cell numbers and migration, it does this using the MAPK pathway. All eukaryotic cells have multiple MAPK pathways that control gene expression, metabolism, survival, mitosis, motility, apoptosis, and differentiation. In addition to this there is the TGF-beta pathway (this pathway acts as a tumor suppressor, by mediating its anti-cell duplication effects in multiple different cell types).

CPNE1 also has a role in promoting the progression of colorectal cancer and increases chemoresistance. This happens due to the activation of the AKT-GLUT1/HK2 cascade (The AKT-glucose transporter 1-hexokinase2 pathway is responsible in regulating the glycolytic process in various cancer cells, due to colorectal cancer the AKT pathway increases the GLUT1 expression, CPNE1 activates the AKT to increase neuronal progenitor cell differentiation causing an implication in the regulation of the pathway.)

In triple-negative breast cancer, CPNE1 increases tumorigenesis and radioresistance, due to the regulation of AKT activation. Due to this, it is possible to use the CPNE1 expression to sensitize the triple-negative breast cancer cells to therapy by radiation. In lung cancer, non-small-cell lung cancer tissues have high demonstrations of CPNE1 which corresponds with lymph node metastasis (a serious condition in which the cancer invaded lymph nodes move to other organs) and less survival in patients.

In hepatocellular carcinoma, overexpressed CPNE1 is a regulator to the cell cycle process in order to mediate cell dedifferentiation.

In gastric cancer (cancer that starts in the cells lining the stomach), CPNE1 is upregulated (the process of increasing the response to a stimulus); This was identified using the Immunohistochemistry and Kaplan-Meier plotter database and the higher the CPNE1 the worse the prognosis. On the other hand, the proliferation of tumors can be suppressed, cell apoptosis can be accelerated and the cell cycle in vitro can enter arrest (in Vitro means in glass, it refers to tests, experiments, and medical procedures performed by researchers outside of living organisms) if the CPNE1 is silenced. In vivo experiments (in Vivo means within the living, it refers to tests, experiments, and medical procedures performed by researchers inside of living organisms)., by using the Xenograft mouse model ( is a model based on the implantation of tumor cells from humans into mice that are immunocompromised in order to avoid graft versus host reaction of the mouse in opposition to the human tumor tissue [graft versus reaction is a systemic disorder that happens when the donated tissue cells think that the host is foreign and attacks the recipient's body cells], tumor growth in vivo was found to be slowed down by the targeted inhibition of CPNE1. The specific inhibition of the DDIT3-FOS-MKNK2 axis has the ability to suppress the excessive cell duplication related to gastric cancer with the knockdown of CPNE1. Overall, it is possible to use CPNE1 as a prognostic biomarker for cancers, however, they correlate with sex, age, cancer stage and tumour grade. Where an increased amount of CPNE1 leads to decreased survival chances and less CPNE1 leads to an increased chance of survival for the patient with cancer.
