= CPNE8 =

Protein-coding gene in humans

Identifiers
- Aliases: CPNE8, copine 8
- External IDs: MGI: 1914121; GeneCards: CPNE8

Gene location (Human)
Chr.	Chromosome 12 (human)
Band	12q12	Start	38,646,822 bp
Band	12q12	End	38,907,430 bp

Gene location (Mouse)
Chr.	Chromosome 15 (mouse)
Band	15|15 E3	Start	90,371,685 bp
Band	15|15 E3	End	90,563,635 bp
RNA expression pattern
Bgee	Human / Mouse (ortholog); Top expressed in: pancreatic epithelial cell; Achilles tendon; sperm; monocyte; right auricle of heart; testicle; right lung; retinal pigment epithelium; subcutaneous adipose tissue; right lobe of liver / Top expressed in: lumbar spinal ganglion; lateral septal nucleus; epithelium of small intestine; seminal vesicula; lip; Region I of hippocampus proper; otolith organ; utricle; facial motor nucleus; blastocyst; More reference expression data
BioGPS	n/a
Gene ontology
Molecular function	molecular function; calcium-dependent phospholipid binding
Cellular component	extracellular exosome; plasma membrane
Biological process	biological process; cellular response to calcium ion
Sources:Amigo / QuickGO
Orthologs
Databases	NCBI: entry; OMA: entry
Species	Human	Mouse
Entrez	144402	66871
Ensembl	ENSG00000139117	ENSMUSG00000052560
UniProt	Q86YQ8	Q9DC53
RefSeq (mRNA)	NM_153634	NM_001033851; NM_025815; NM_001357979
RefSeq (protein)	NP_705898	NP_001029023; NP_080091; NP_001344908
Location (UCSC)	Chr 12: 38.65 – 38.91 Mb	Chr 15: 90.37 – 90.56 Mb
PubMed search
- Wikidata
View/Edit Human	View/Edit Mouse

Copine-8 is a protein that in humans is encoded by the CPNE8 gene.

Calcium-dependent membrane-binding proteins may regulate molecular events at the interface of the cell membrane and cytoplasm. This gene is one of several genes that encode a calcium-dependent protein containing two N-terminal type II C2 domains and an integrin A domain-like sequence in the C-terminus.
