= RIMS2 =

Gene of the species Homo sapiens

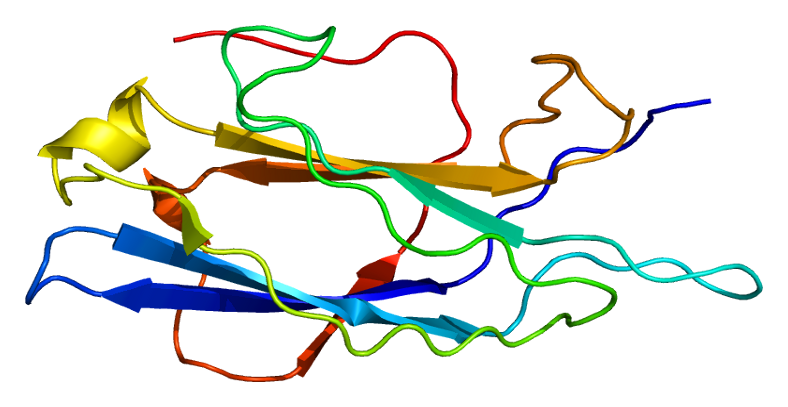

Identifiers
- Aliases: RIMS2, OBOE, RAB3IP3, RIM2, regulating synaptic membrane exocytosis 2
- External IDs: OMIM: 606630; MGI: 2152972; GeneCards: RIMS2
Available structures
PDB	Ortholog search: PDBe RCSB
PDB	List of PDB id codes 1V27, 1WFG

Gene location (Mouse)
Chr.	Chromosome 15 (mouse)
Band	15 B3.1|15 15.45 cM	Start	39,061,656 bp
Band	15 B3.1|15 15.45 cM	End	39,547,768 bp
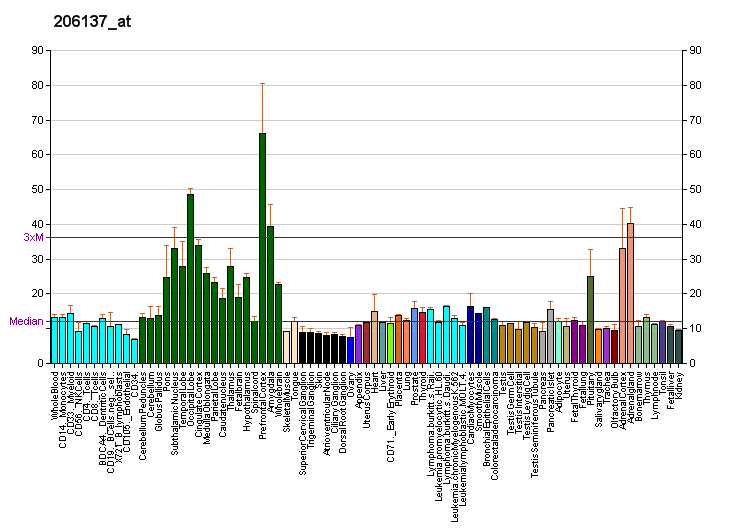
RNA expression pattern
Bgee	Human / Mouse (ortholog); n/a / Top expressed in: Rostral migratory stream; neural layer of retina; lateral geniculate nucleus; medial dorsal nucleus; cerebellar vermis; lobe of cerebellum; inferior colliculi; nucleus accumbens; lateral septal nucleus; medial geniculate nucleus
BioGPS	More reference expression data
Gene ontology
Molecular function	metal ion binding; protein binding; transmembrane transporter binding
Cellular component	membrane; plasma membrane; synapse; intracellular anatomical structure; presynaptic active zone; cell junction; extracellular exosome; presynaptic membrane; cytoskeleton of presynaptic active zone; presynaptic active zone cytoplasmic component
Biological process	cell differentiation; spontaneous neurotransmitter secretion; positive regulation of inhibitory postsynaptic potential; insulin secretion; regulation of exocytosis; positive regulation of gene expression; positive regulation of excitatory postsynaptic potential; positive regulation of dendrite extension; intracellular protein transport; cAMP-mediated signaling; calcium-ion regulated exocytosis; regulation of membrane potential; calcium ion-regulated exocytosis of neurotransmitter; regulation of synaptic vesicle exocytosis; exocytosis; regulation of synaptic plasticity; positive regulation of synaptic transmission
Sources:Amigo / QuickGO
Orthologs
Databases	NCBI: entry; OMA: entry
Species	Human	Mouse
Entrez	9699	116838
Ensembl	ENSG00000176406	ENSMUSG00000037386
UniProt	Q9UQ26	Q9EQZ7
RefSeq (mRNA)	NM_001100117; NM_001282881; NM_001282882; NM_014677	NM_001256382; NM_001256383; NM_001256384; NM_053271
RefSeq (protein)	NP_001093587; NP_001269810; NP_001269811; NP_055492; NP_001335413 NP_001335414; NP_001335415; NP_001335416; NP_001335417; NP_001335418; NP_001335419; NP_001335420; NP_001335421; NP_001335422; NP_001335423; NP_001335424; NP_001335425; NP_001335426; NP_001335427; NP_001335428; NP_001335429; NP_001335430; NP_001335431; NP_001335432; NP_001335433; NP_001335434; NP_001335435; NP_001335436; NP_001335437; NP_001335438	NP_001243311; NP_001243312; NP_001243313; NP_444501
Location (UCSC)	n/a	Chr 15: 39.06 – 39.55 Mb
PubMed search
- Wikidata
View/Edit Human	View/Edit Mouse

Regulating synaptic membrane exocytosis protein 2 is a protein that in humans is encoded by the RIMS2 gene.

== Interactions ==
RIMS2 has been shown to interact with YWHAH, RAPGEF4, and UNC13A.
