= SYT4 =

Protein-coding gene in the species Homo sapiens

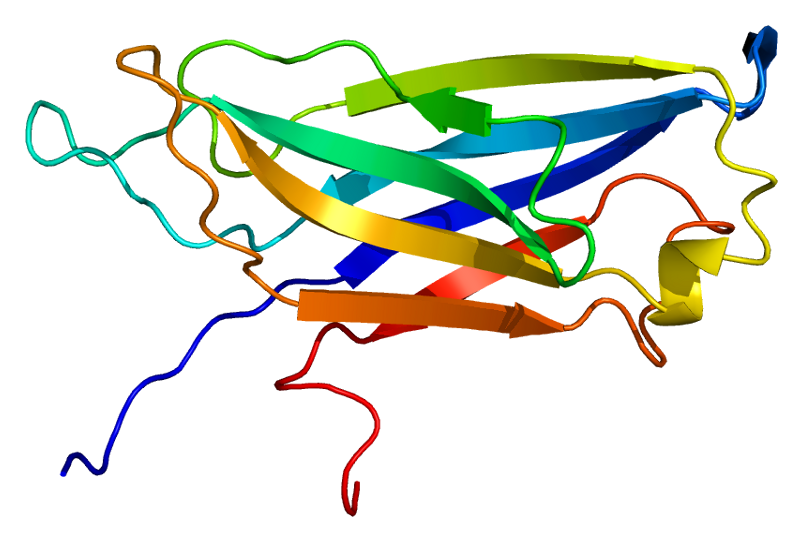

Identifiers
- Aliases: SYT4, HsT1192, synaptotagmin 4
- External IDs: OMIM: 600103; MGI: 101759; GeneCards: SYT4
Available structures
PDB	Ortholog search: PDBe RCSB
PDB	List of PDB id codes 1UGK

Gene location (Human)
Chr.	Chromosome 18 (human)
Band	18q12.3	Start	43,267,892 bp
Band	18q12.3	End	43,277,535 bp

Gene location (Mouse)
Chr.	Chromosome 18 (mouse)
Band	18 B1|18 17.75 cM	Start	31,570,861 bp
Band	18 B1|18 17.75 cM	End	31,580,459 bp
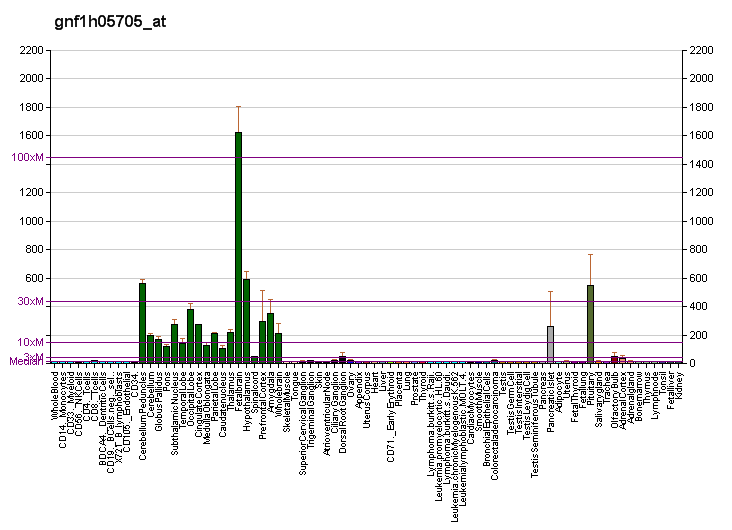

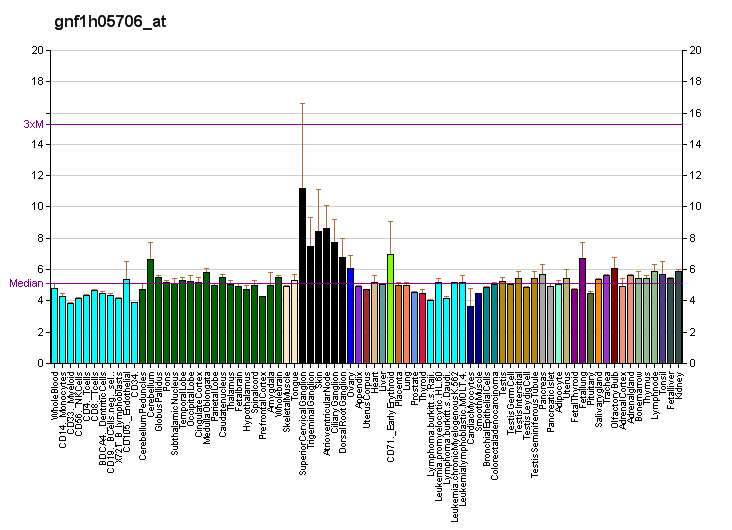
RNA expression pattern
Bgee	Human / Mouse (ortholog); Top expressed in: cerebellar vermis; endothelial cell; cerebellar hemisphere; Brodmann area 23; right hemisphere of cerebellum; Brodmann area 46; middle temporal gyrus; superior frontal gyrus; superior vestibular nucleus; islet of Langerhans / Top expressed in: lobe of cerebellum; cerebellar vermis; ventral tegmental area; pineal gland; dorsomedial hypothalamic nucleus; habenula; anterior amygdaloid area; ventromedial nucleus; paraventricular nucleus of hypothalamus; lateral hypothalamus; More reference expression data
BioGPS	More reference expression data
Gene ontology
Molecular function	calcium ion binding; clathrin binding; phosphatidylserine binding; metal ion binding; protein binding; SNARE binding; syntaxin-1 binding; syntaxin binding; syntaxin-3 binding; protein homodimerization activity; protein heterodimerization activity; calcium-dependent phospholipid binding
Cellular component	integral component of membrane; intracellular membrane-bounded organelle; membrane; synapse; synaptic vesicle membrane; cell junction; perinuclear region of cytoplasm; neuron projection; dense core granule; cytoplasmic vesicle; dendrite; Golgi apparatus; vesicle; axon; plasma membrane; synaptic vesicle; integral component of Golgi membrane; integral component of synaptic vesicle membrane; secretory granule membrane; dense core granule membrane; somatodendritic compartment; soma; neuron projection terminus; exocytic vesicle; astrocyte projection; microvesicle; glutamatergic synapse; integral component of neuronal dense core vesicle membrane
Biological process	cell differentiation; brain development; positive regulation of dendrite extension; negative regulation of vesicle fusion; neurotransmitter secretion; exocytosis; vesicle fusion; calcium ion-regulated exocytosis of neurotransmitter; memory; positive regulation of glutamate secretion; regulation of dopamine secretion; regulation of endocytosis; regulation of vesicle fusion; negative regulation of catecholamine secretion; positive regulation of calcium ion-dependent exocytosis; negative regulation of neurotransmitter secretion; negative regulation of short-term neuronal synaptic plasticity; vesicle fusion with vesicle; secretory granule maturation; negative regulation of protein secretion; negative regulation of retrograde trans-synaptic signaling by neuropeptide; regulation of calcium ion-dependent exocytosis; negative regulation of calcium ion-dependent exocytosis; trans-synaptic signaling by BDNF, modulating synaptic transmission; vesicle-mediated transport; calcium-ion regulated exocytosis; cellular response to calcium ion; regulation of presynaptic dense core granule exocytosis; negative regulation of dense core granule exocytosis; positive regulation of dense core granule exocytosis; negative regulation of synaptic vesicle exocytosis
Sources:Amigo / QuickGO
Orthologs
Databases	NCBI: entry; OMA: entry
Species	Human	Mouse
Entrez	6860	20983
Ensembl	ENSG00000132872	ENSMUSG00000024261
UniProt	Q9H2B2	P40749
RefSeq (mRNA)	NM_020783	NM_009308
RefSeq (protein)	NP_065834	NP_033334
Location (UCSC)	Chr 18: 43.27 – 43.28 Mb	Chr 18: 31.57 – 31.58 Mb
PubMed search
- Wikidata
View/Edit Human	View/Edit Mouse

Synaptotagmin-4 is a protein that in humans is encoded by the SYT4 gene.
