= Ribbon synapse =

Details
- Function: Synapse

Identifiers
- Latin: synapsis fasciolaris
- TH: H2.00.06.2.00024

The ribbon synapse is a type of neuronal synapse characterized by the presence of an electron-dense structure, the synaptic ribbon, that holds vesicles close to the active zone. It is characterized by a tight vesicle-calcium channel coupling that promotes rapid neurotransmitter release and sustained signal transmission. Ribbon synapses undergo a cycle of exocytosis and endocytosis in response to graded changes of membrane potential. It has been proposed that most ribbon synapses undergo a special type of exocytosis based on coordinated multivesicular release. This interpretation has recently been questioned at the inner hair cell ribbon synapse, where it has been instead proposed that exocytosis is described by uniquantal (i.e., univesicular) release shaped by a flickering vesicle fusion pore.

These unique features specialize the ribbon synapse to enable extremely fast, precise and sustained neurotransmission, which is critical for the perception of complex senses such as vision and hearing. Ribbon synapses are found in retinal photoreceptor cells, vestibular organ receptors, cochlear hair cells, retinal bipolar cells, and pinealocytes.

The synaptic ribbon is a unique structure at the active zone of the synapse. It is positioned several nanometers away from the pre-synaptic membrane and tethers 100 or more synaptic vesicles. Each pre-synaptic cell can have from 10 to 100 ribbons tethered at the membrane, or a total number of 1000–10000 vesicles in close proximity to active zones. The ribbon synapse was first identified in the retina as a thin, ribbon-like presynaptic projection surrounded by a halo of vesicles using transmission electron microscopy in the 1950s, as the technique was gaining mainstream usage.

== Structure ==
=== Microscopic ===
The photoreceptor ribbon synapse is around 30 nm in thickness. It sticks out into the cytoplasm around 200-1000 nm and anchors along its base to the arciform density which is an electron dense structure that is anchored to the presynaptic membrane. The arciform density is located within the synaptic ridge, a small evagination of the presynaptic membrane. Hair cells lack an arciform density so the anchor of this ribbon is considered to be invisible by electron microscope. The ribbon's surface has small particles that are around 5 nm wide where the synaptic vesicles tether densely via fine protein filaments. There are multiple filaments per vesicle. There are also voltage gated L-type calcium channels on the docking sites of the ribbon synapse which trigger neurotransmitter release. Specifically, ribbon synapses contain specialized organelles called synaptic ribbons, which are large presynaptic structures associated in the active zone. They are thought to fine-tune the synaptic vesicle cycle. Synaptic ribbons are in close proximity to synaptic vesicles, which, in turn, are close to the presynaptic neurotransmitter release site via the ribbon.

Postsynaptic structures differ for cochlear cells and photoreceptor cells. Hair cells is capable of one action potential propagation for one vesicle release. One vesicle release from the presynaptic hair cell onto the postsynaptic bouton is enough to create an action potential in the auditory afferent cells. Photoreceptors allow one vesicle release for many action potential propagation. The rod terminal and cone ribbon synapse of the photoreceptors have horizontal synaptic spines expressing AMPA receptors with additional bipolar dendrites exhibiting the mGluR6 receptors. These structures allow for the binding of multiple molecules of glutamate, allowing for the propagation of many action potentials.

=== Molecular ===
The molecular composition between conventional neuronal synapse and ribbon synapse is surprisingly dissimilar. At the core of synaptic vesicle exocytosis machinery in vertebrate neuronal synapses is the SNARE complex. The minimally functional SNARE complex includes syntaxin 1, VAMP 1 and 2, and SNAP-25. In contrast, genetic ablation or application of botulinum, targeting SNAP-25, syntaxin 1–3, and VAMP 1–3, did not affect inner hair cell ribbon synapse exocytosis in mice. Additionally, no neuronal SNAREs were observed in hair cells using immunostaining, pointing to the possibility of a different exocytosis mechanism. However, several studies found SNARE mRNA and protein expressed in hair cell, perhaps indicating presence of a neuronal SNARE complex in ribbon synapse that is present in low levels and with very redundant components.

Several proteins of the synaptic ribbon have also been found to be associated with conventional synapses. RIM (Rab3-interacting proteins) is a GTPase expressed on synaptic vesicles that is important in priming synaptic vesicles. Immunostaining has revealed the presence of KIF3A, a component of the kinesin II motor complex whose function is still unknown. The presynaptic cytomatrix proteins Bassoon and Piccolo are both expressed at photoreceptor ribbons, but Piccolo is only expressed at retinal bipolar synaptic ribbons. Bassoon is responsible for attaching itself to the base of the synaptic ribbons and subsequently anchoring the synaptic ribbons. The function of Piccolo is unknown. Also important is the filaments that tether the vesicles to the ribbon synapse. These are shed during high rates of exocytosis. The only unique protein associated with the synaptic ribbon is RIBEYE, first identified in purified synaptic ribbon from bovine retina. RIBEYE is encoded in vertebrate genomes as an alternative transcript of the CtBP2 gene. During chicken and human retinal development, RIBEYE is expressed in photoreceptor and bipolar cell retinal neurons. It is found to be a part of all vertebrate synaptic ribbons in ribbon synapses and is the central portion of ribbon synapses. RIBEYE interactions are required to form a scaffold formation protein of the synaptic ribbon.

There has been a significant amount of research into the pre-synaptic cytomatrix protein Bassoon, which is a multi-domain scaffolding protein universally expressed at synapses in the central nervous system. Mutations in Bassoon have been shown to result in decreased synaptic transmission. However, the underlying mechanisms behind this observed phenomenon are not fully understood and are currently being investigated. It has been observed that in the retina of Bassoon-mutant mice, photoreceptor ribbon synapses are not anchored to pre-synaptic active zones during photoreceptor synaptogenesis. The photoreceptor ribbon synapses are observed to be free floating in the cytoplasm of the photoreceptor terminals. These observations have led to the conclusion that Bassoon plays a critical role in the formation of the photoreceptor ribbon synapse.

=== Structural plasticity ===
In correspondence to its activity, ribbon synapses can have synaptic ribbons that vary in size. In mouse photoreceptor synapses when the neurotransmitter release rate is high and exocytosis is high, the synaptic ribbons are long. When neurotransmitter release rate is low and exocytosis is low, the synaptic ribbons are short. A current hypothesis is that synaptic ribbons can enlarge by the addition of more RIBEYE subunit.

== Function ==
Features of the ribbon synapse enable it to process information extremely quickly. Bipolar neurons present a good model for how ribbon synapses function.

Information is conveyed from photoreceptor cells to bipolar cells via the release of the neurotransmitter glutamate at the ribbon synapse. Conventional neurons encode information by changes in the rate of action potentials, but for complex senses like vision, this is not sufficient. Ribbon synapses enable neurons to transmit light signals over a dynamic range of several orders of magnitude in intensity. This is achieved by encoding intensity changes in tonic rate of transmitter release which requires the release of several hundred to several thousand synaptic vesicles per second.

To accomplish this level of performance, the sensory neurons of the eye maintain large pools of fast releasable vesicles that are equipped with ribbon synapses. This enables the cell to exocytose hundreds of vesicles per second, greatly exceeding the rate of neurons without the specialized ribbon synapse.

The current hypothesis of calcium-dependent exocytosis at retinal ribbon synapses suggests that the ribbon accommodates a reservoir of primed releasable vesicles. The vesicles that are in closest contact with the presynaptic plasma membrane at the base of the ribbon constitute the small, rapidly releasable pool of vesicles, whereas the remaining vesicles tethered to the ribbon constitute the large, readily (slower) releasable pool. These regularly aligned rows of synaptic vesicles tethered to either side of the ribbon along with the expression of the kinesin motor protein KIF3A at retinal ribbon synapses can move vesicles like a conveyor belt to the docking/release site at the ribbon base.

=== Exocytosis ===
During exocytosis at the bipolar ribbon synapse, vesicles are seen to pause at the membrane and then upon opening of the calcium channels to promptly release their contents within milliseconds. Like most exocytosis, Ca^{2+} regulates the release of vesicles from the presynaptic membrane. Different types of ribbon synapses have different dependence on Ca^{2+} releases. The hair cell ribbon synapses exhibit a steep dependence on Ca^{2+} concentration, while the photoreceptor synapses is less steeply dependent on Ca^{2+} and is stimulated by much lower levels of free Ca^{2+}. The hair cell ribbon synapse experiences spontaneous activity in the absence of stimuli, under conditions of a constant hair cell membrane potential. Voltage clamp at the postsynaptic bouton showed that the bouton experiences a wide range of excitatory postsynaptic current amplitudes. The current amplitude distribution is a positive-skew, with a range of larger amplitudes for both spontaneous and stimulus evoked release. It was thought that this current distribution was not explainable with single vesicle release, and other scenarios of release have been proposed: coordinated multivesicular release, kiss-and-run, or compound fusion of vesicles prior to exocytosis. However it has been recently proposed that uniquantal release with fusion pore flickering is the most plausible interpretation of the found current distribution. In fact, the charge distribution of currents is actually normally distributed, supporting the uniquantal release scenario. It has been shown that the skewness of the current amplitude distribution is well explained by different time courses of neurotransmitter release of a single vesicles with a flickering fusion pore.

The bipolar cell active zone of the ribbon synapse can release neurotransmitter continuously for hundreds of milliseconds during strong stimulation. This release of neurotransmitters occurs in two kinetically distinct phases: a small fast pool where about twenty percent of the total is released in about 1 millisecond, and a large sustained pool where the remaining components are released over hundreds of milliseconds. The existence of correspondence between the pool of tethered vesicles and the pool for sustained release in the rods and bipolar cells of the ribbon reveals that the ribbon may serve as a platform where the vesicles can be primed to allow sustained release of neurotransmitters. This large size of the sustained large component is what separates the ribbon synapse active zones from those of conventional neurons where sustained release is small in comparison. Once the presynaptic vesicles have been depleted, the bipolar cell's releasable pool requires several seconds to refill with the help of ATP hydrolysis.

=== Endocytosis ===
A high rate of endocytosis is necessary to counter the high rate of exocytosis during sustained neurotransmitter release at ribbon synapses. Synaptic vesicles need to be recycled for further transmission to occur. These vesicles are directly recycled and because of their mobility, quickly replenish the neurotransmitters required for continued release. In cone photoreceptors, the fused membrane is recycled into the synaptic vesicle without pooling of the membrane into the endosomes. Bipolar cells rely on a different mechanism. It involves taking a large portion of the membrane which is endocytosed and gives rise to synaptic vesicles. This mechanism is conserved in hair cells as well.

== Research ==
=== Loss of hearing and sight in mice ===
Research has shown that abnormal expression of otoferlin, a ribbon synapse associated protein, impairs exocytosis of ribbon-bound vesicles in auditory inner hair cells. Otoferlin displays similar functional characteristics to synaptotagmin, a synapse associated protein important for mediating exocytosis in many other synapses (such as those in the central nervous system). Impaired hearing in mice has been shown to be associated with disrupted expression of otoferlin.

In studies of retinal genetic coding of laboratory mice, several mutated ribbon synapse associated voltage-gated L-type calcium channel auxiliary subunits were shown to be associated with dysfunctional rod and cone activity and information transmission. Mice were shown to express significantly reduced scotopic vision, and further research has shown the dysregulation of calcium homeostasis may have a significant role in rod photoreceptor degradation and death.

=== Human implications ===
Much of the genetic information associated with the proteins observed in laboratory mice are shared with humans. The protein otoferlin is observed phenotypically in human auditory inner hair cells, and abnormal expression has been linked with deafness. In humans, cochlear implants have shown to reduce the debilitating effects of abnormal otoferlin expression by surpassing the synapse associated with the auditory inner hair cells. The genetic code for retinal subunits associated with impaired scotopic vision and rod photoreceptor degradation are conserved at approximately 93% between mice and humans. Further research into the abnormal functioning of these mechanisms could open the door to therapeutic techniques to relieve auditory and visual impairments.

=== Other areas ===
Several recent studies have provided evidence that loss-of-function mutations in pre-synaptic proteins of the photoreceptor cells ribbon synapse can cause X-linked congenital stationary night blindness (CSNB) through mutations in the CACNA1F gene, which codes for the αF1-subunit of the L-type calcium channel Ca_{v}1.4. The gene is expressed at the active zone of photoreceptor ribbon synapses. The mutation is characterized by a significant reduction in both night and variable perturbation of daylight vision. The mutations in CACNA1F and Ca_{v}1.4 have also been observed to co-localize with CaBP4, a photoreceptor-specific calcium-binding protein. CaBP4 has been theorized to modulate the activity of the Ca_{v}1.4 channel. It has been theorized to be associated with the proper establishment and maintenance of photoreceptor ribbon synapses. While no evidence has been published, the association between CaBP4 and Ca_{v}1.4 is an area of continued research.
