= UNC13A =

Protein-coding gene in the species Homo sapiens

Identifiers
- Aliases: UNC13A, Munc13-1, unc-13 homolog A (C. elegans), unc-13 homolog A
- External IDs: OMIM: 609894; MGI: 3051532; GeneCards: UNC13A

Gene location (Human)
Chr.	Chromosome 19 (human)
Band	19p13.11	Start	17,601,336 bp
Band	19p13.11	End	17,688,365 bp

Gene location (Mouse)
Chr.	Chromosome 8 (mouse)
Band	8|8 B3.3	Start	72,077,061 bp
Band	8|8 B3.3	End	72,124,401 bp
RNA expression pattern
Bgee	Human / Mouse (ortholog); Top expressed in: right hemisphere of cerebellum; beta cell; olfactory bulb; right frontal lobe; prefrontal cortex; superior frontal gyrus; middle temporal gyrus; dorsolateral prefrontal cortex; Brodmann area 9; pituitary gland / Top expressed in: superior frontal gyrus; dentate gyrus of hippocampal formation granule cell; primary visual cortex; primary motor cortex; neural layer of retina; cerebellar cortex; piriform cortex; prefrontal cortex; hippocampus proper; subiculum; More reference expression data
BioGPS	n/a
Gene ontology
Molecular function	syntaxin-1 binding; metal ion binding; diacylglycerol binding; calmodulin binding; calcium ion binding; phospholipid binding
Cellular component	cytoplasm; membrane; neuromuscular junction; plasma membrane; synapse; axon; cell junction; neuron projection; presynaptic membrane; presynapse; terminal bouton; calyx of Held; presynaptic active zone; glutamatergic synapse; synaptic vesicle membrane; presynaptic active zone cytoplasmic component
Biological process	cell differentiation; intracellular signal transduction; synaptic vesicle docking; synaptic transmission, glutamatergic; regulation of short-term neuronal synaptic plasticity; positive regulation of neurotransmitter secretion; amyloid-beta metabolic process; neuromuscular junction development; positive regulation of dendrite extension; regulation of synaptic transmission, glutamatergic; innervation; synaptic vesicle maturation; neurotransmitter secretion; exocytosis; chemical synaptic transmission; synaptic vesicle exocytosis; synaptic vesicle priming; positive regulation of synaptic plasticity; positive regulation of glutamate receptor signaling pathway; regulation of amyloid precursor protein catabolic process; presynaptic dense core vesicle exocytosis; dense core granule priming
Sources:Amigo / QuickGO
Orthologs
Databases	NCBI: entry; OMA: entry
Species	Human	Mouse
Entrez	23025	382018
Ensembl	ENSG00000130477	ENSMUSG00000034799
UniProt	Q9UPW8	Q4KUS2
RefSeq (mRNA)	NM_001080421; NM_001387021; NM_001387022; NM_001387023	NM_001029873
RefSeq (protein)	NP_001073890	NP_001025044
Location (UCSC)	Chr 19: 17.6 – 17.69 Mb	Chr 8: 72.08 – 72.12 Mb
PubMed search
- Wikidata
View/Edit Human	View/Edit Mouse

Unc-13 homolog A (C. elegans) is a protein that in humans is encoded by the UNC13A gene and in mice by the Munc13-1 gene.

== Function ==
This gene encodes a member of the UNC13 family. UNC13A plays a role in vesicle maturation during exocytosis as a target of the diacylglycerol second messenger pathway. It is involved in neurotransmitter release by acting in synaptic vesicle priming prior to vesicle fusion and participates in the activity-dependent refilling of readily releasable vesicle pool. In Drosophila melanogaster, the protein has been shown to define the vesicle release site by regulating the coupling distance between synaptic vesicles and calcium channels in cooperation with another isoform, UNC13B. It is particularly important in most glutamatergic-mediated synapses as well as GABA-mediated synapses. It plays a role in dendrite formation by melanocytes and in secretory granule priming in insulin secretion.

== Protein structure ==
Several conserved domains have been found in UNC13A. These conserved domains include three C2 domains. One C2 domain is centrally located, another is at the carboxyl end, and there is a third. In addition, there is one C1 domain, as well as Munc13 homology domains 1 (MHD1) and 2 (MHD2).

== Subcellular location ==
UNC13A is localized to the active zone of presynaptic density. It is translocated to the plasma membrane in response to phorbol ester binding.

== Interaction ==
UNC13A has been shown to interact with:

- STX1A,
- STX1B1,
- DOC2A,
- BSN,
- RIMS1,
- RIMS2,
- ERC2, and
- RAB3A.

== Clinical significance ==
Single nucleotide polymorphisms in this gene may be associated with sporadic amyotrophic lateral sclerosis. This single nucleotide polymorphism has been discovered on chromosome 19. This variation of the single nucleotide involving UNC13A has also been implicated in frontotemporal dementia (FTD). Pathology of TDP-43 in both ALS and FTD results in a cryptic exon being expressed in UNC13A, which is exercerbated by the single nucleotide polymorphisms associated with ALS and FTD risk. This gene has also been associated with Alzheimer's disease (AD).
