= Multivesicular release =

Communication between neurons happens primarily through chemical neurotransmission at the synapse. Neurotransmitters are packaged into synaptic vesicles for release from the presynaptic cell into the synapse, from where they diffuse and can bind to postsynaptic receptors. While most presynaptic cells are historically thought to release one vesicle at a time per active site, more recent research has pointed towards the possibility of multiple vesicles being released from the same active site (multivesicular release; MVR) in response to an action potential.

== Basics of neuronal signaling ==
In the nervous system there are primarily two ways of propagating signals. By far the most common method of intracellular signal propagation is the action potential. The dendrites of neurons contain ionotropic (aka ligand-gated ion channel) and metabotropic neurotransmitter receptors that bind chemical neurotransmitters. At ionotropic receptors, these chemical neurotransmitters cause quick changes in ion flux into or out of the cell. The resulting internal voltage change in the dendrites is propagated towards the cell body and axon hillock, where a large concentration of voltage-gated ion channels typically exists. If some voltage threshold is met, voltage gated sodium channels open up, letting in a critical charge of sodium, and the positive current propagates down the axon towards the presynaptic axon terminal. This action potential leads to neurotransmitter vesicular release at in this terminal.

While action potentials are the typical means of signal propagation in the nervous system, some sensory neurons use graded potentials to trigger vesicular release. These cells are typically short enough that regenerative action potentials aren't needed to cause a large enough voltage change at the presynaptic terminal. For example, photoreceptor cells in the eye produce graded potentials in response to light, and these graded potentials can directly lead to neurotransmitter release.

== Univesicular release ==
Most presynaptic terminals release small numbers of neurotransmitter containing vesicles even when action potentials are not present. This is stochastic and the probability of release (Pr) can be modified by numerous factors including the presence and speed of an action potential. These vesicles are released at synaptic active zones, areas of the axon terminal that have all of the machinery and conditions necessary to specialize in vesicle fusion with the plasma membrane. Until relatively recently, the prevailing hypothesis was that only one vesicle at a time is released from these active zones. However, research over the past several decades has added support for an additional mechanism of neurotransmitter vesicle release.

== Multivesicular release hypothesis ==
While univesicular release is still believed to make up a substantial portion of transmitter release events, large fluctuations in postsynaptic cell current measurements and high transmitter concentration in some synapses have led to the hypothesis that multiple vesicles can be released per active zone with each action potential. Since vesicular release happens on the scale of microseconds, it has been difficult to capture direct electron microscopic evidence of this phenomenon. There is however considerable functional data that supports MVR throughout much of the brain and sensory neuron synapses.

== Effects on signaling ==
MVR is thought to affect signal strength in postsynaptic neurons that typically have low receptor occupancy; this number can vary widely throughout the nervous system. This means that for however many receptors are found on a postsynaptic cell in the area of presynaptic cell vesicle release, only a small number of them would typically be occupied by neurotransmitter released from one vesicle (each vesicle can contain up to approximately 10,000 molecules of neurotransmitter). MVR increases the likelihood that an action potential in a presynaptic cell will result in a postsynaptic cell chance in action potential likelihood. This could be either more or fewer action potentials, depending upon if the neurotransmitter / receptor combo is excitatory or inhibitory.

== Physiological effects ==
MVR likely plays a substantial role in hippocampal signaling and memory. MVR exists in both near-synchronous (mulitiple vesicles released within tens of microseconds) and desynchronous (multiple vesicles released over a somewhat longer timescale). These different types of MVR can have differential effects on the post-synaptic neuron. Near-synchronous MVR leads to a fast onset and decline of synapse neurotransmitter levels as the molecules diffuse away or are taken up by neurotransmitter reuptake transporters (e.g. synapse glutamate transporters in neurons and glia. In the hippocampus, AMPA receptors that bind glutamate released in this manner produce a relatively large positive change in postsynaptic dendrite current (also called the excitatory postsynaptic current; EPSC). When the same receptors are exposed to de-synchronous MVR, which can lead to the same level of synaptic neurotransmitter but over a much longer timescale, the AMPA receptors can become desensitized, which leads to a smaller EPSC. This desensitization can reduce AMPA receptor availability and contribute to short-term depression, one of the fundamental mechanisms of learning and memory in hippocampal circuits.

NMDA receptors are one of the other main types of glutamatergic receptors in the hippocampus. NMDA receptors allow calcium into the postsynaptic cell when they bind glutamate. Previous work in the hippocampus has shown that the response to stimulation of a single axon can be highly variable. Unlike earlier electrophysiology studies that studied postsynaptic currents due to calcium influx at multiple synapses, improved experimental techniques have allowed the isolation and study of individual synapses. This revolution in experimental technique has helped answer the question if the variable response to stimulation is due to UVR at a varying number of synapses, or to MVR at a single synapse. Individual synapse studies have found that after presynaptic axon stimulation, the postsynaptic NMDA-mediated calcium influx is highly variable, supporting the hypothesis that MVR can play a role at these synapses as well.

One of the main benefits of MVR is thought to be the maintenance of information fidelity. Many sensory synapses take advantage of MVR to regulate firing duration and frequency, and to ensure reliable and sustained postsynaptic firing at high frequencies. Small changes in postsynaptic current are less likely to affect action potential generation than large ones are, hence the "information" held within presynaptic cell activity is less likely to make it farther downstream in the circuit. Since MVR results in release of more neurotransmitter, the changes in postsynaptic current tend to be larger, and information is more likely to be reliably propagated downstream.

MVR is also thought to participate in vesicular release at ribbon synapses that are prominent in the sensory nervous system. Presynaptic cells at primary synapses in the sensory nervous system typically are smaller than many other neurons, and can rely on graded potentials in the cells to reliably trigger neurotransmitter release at their synaptic terminals. These graded potentials can last for several seconds and result in the release of thousands of neurotransmitter vesicles from a neuron. These synapses have specialized ribbon-like protein structures that can bind thousands of vesicles at a time, and MVR is capable of modulating a high level of vesicular release to transmit meaningful changes in sensation to the next sensory neuron downstream.

The balance between UVR and MVR is not necessarily static at any given synapse, as it can change over time. During development, many synapses undergo activity dependent pruning. In general, those that are less active are most likely to be removed from the nervous system compared to those that are more active. This phenomenon has been observed in several brain areas, including the cerebellum. In this structure, many climbing fibers synapse onto individual Purkinje neurons. The climbing fiber axon terminals with the highest level of MVR versus UVR tend to cause the largest change in Purkinje neuron calcium influx, and these synapses are typically retained in the developing circuitry compared to those that have a lower level of calcium influx. In the developing auditory system, MVR becomes less prominent as the Calyx of Held synapses mature and change shape. At this location, these shape changes increase action potential speed and decrease Pr. The decrease in Pr and MVR reduces synaptic glutamate and AMPA receptor desensitization, leading to a higher frequency of action potentials in the postsynaptic neuron. These maturation induced changes in MVR are also likely relevant at other locations in the developing nervous system.
