= RIMS1 =

Gene of the species Homo sapiens

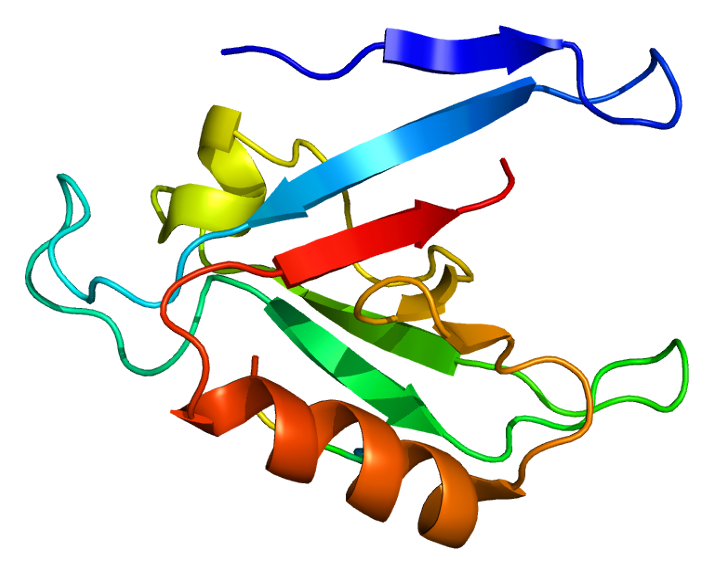

Identifiers
- Aliases: RIMS1, CORD7, RAB3IP2, RIM, RIM1, regulating synaptic membrane exocytosis 1
- External IDs: OMIM: 606629; MGI: 2152971; GeneCards: RIMS1
Available structures
PDB	Ortholog search: PDBe RCSB
PDB	List of PDB id codes 2CSS
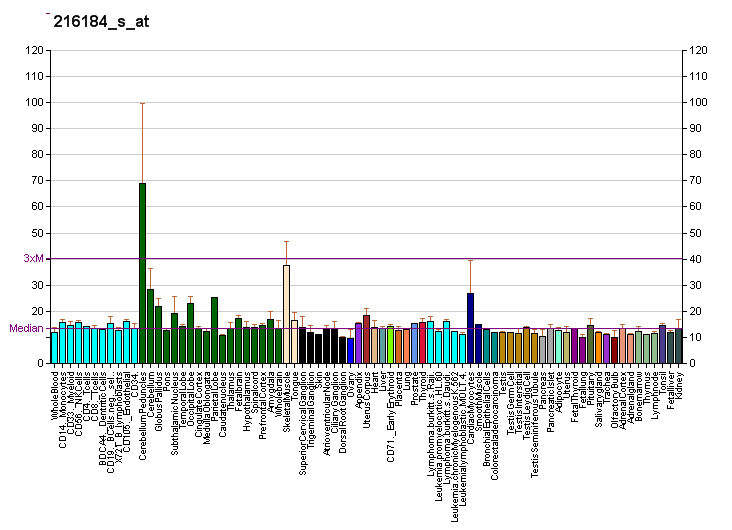
RNA expression pattern
Bgee	Human / Mouse (ortholog); n/a / n/a
BioGPS	More reference expression data
Gene ontology
Molecular function	GTPase regulator activity; metal ion binding; protein binding; transmembrane transporter binding; RNA binding
Cellular component	cytosol; membrane; plasma membrane; synapse; presynaptic active zone; cell junction; presynaptic membrane; cytoskeleton of presynaptic active zone; presynaptic active zone cytoplasmic component
Biological process	cell differentiation; response to stimulus; synaptic vesicle exocytosis; positive regulation of inhibitory postsynaptic potential; membrane fusion; regulation of neurotransmitter secretion; secretion; glutamate secretion; positive regulation of gene expression; positive regulation of excitatory postsynaptic potential; positive regulation of dendrite extension; regulated exocytosis; intracellular protein transport; neurotransmitter transport; neurotransmitter secretion; visual perception; calcium-ion regulated exocytosis; exocytosis; regulation of catalytic activity; regulation of membrane potential; calcium ion-regulated exocytosis of neurotransmitter; regulation of synaptic vesicle exocytosis; transport; regulation of synaptic plasticity; positive regulation of synaptic transmission; protein-containing complex assembly; acrosomal vesicle exocytosis
Sources:Amigo / QuickGO
Orthologs
Databases	NCBI: entry; OMA: entry
Species	Human	Mouse
Entrez	22999	116837
Ensembl	ENSG00000079841	ENSMUSG00000041670
UniProt	Q86UR5	Q99NE5
RefSeq (mRNA)	NM_001168407; NM_001168408; NM_001168409; NM_001168410; NM_001168411 NM_014989	NM_001012623; NM_001012624; NM_001012625; NM_053270; NM_183018
RefSeq (protein)	NP_001161879; NP_001161880; NP_001161881; NP_001161882; NP_001161883 NP_055804; NP_001337340; NP_001337341; NP_001337342; NP_001337343; NP_001337344; NP_001337345; NP_001337346; NP_001337347; NP_001337348; NP_001337349; NP_001337350; NP_001337351; NP_001337352; NP_001337353; NP_001337354; NP_001337355; NP_001337356; NP_001337357; NP_001337358; NP_001337359; NP_001337360; NP_001337361; NP_001337362; NP_001337363; NP_001337364; NP_001337365; NP_001337366; NP_001337367; NP_001337368; NP_001337369; NP_001337370; NP_001337371; NP_001337372; NP_001337373; NP_001337374; NP_001337375; NP_001337376; NP_001337377; NP_001337378; NP_001337379; NP_001337381; NP_001337383; NP_001337384; NP_001337385; NP_001337386; NP_001337387; NP_001337388; NP_001337389; NP_001337390; NP_001337391; NP_001337392; NP_001337393; NP_001337394; NP_001337395; NP_001337396; NP_001337397; NP_001337398; NP_001337399; NP_001337400; NP_001337401; NP_001337402; NP_001337403	NP_001012641; NP_001012642; NP_001012643; NP_444500; NP_898839
Location (UCSC)	n/a	n/a
PubMed search
- Wikidata
View/Edit Human	View/Edit Mouse

Regulating synaptic membrane exocytosis protein 1 is a protein that in humans is encoded by the RIMS1 gene.

== Function ==
RAB3A (MIM 179490), a member of the Ras superfamily of genes, is a synaptic vesicle protein that regulates synaptic vesicle exocytosis. MUNC13 (UNC13; MIM 605836) and its isoforms are required for priming synaptic vesicles for exocytosis. The RIM family of active zone proteins likely function as protein scaffolds that help regulate vesicle exocytosis during short-term plasticity.[supplied by OMIM]

== Clinical significance ==
Mutations of the gene cause cone-rod dystrophy 7.

== Interactions ==
RIMS1 has been shown to interact with:

- ERC2,
- RAB3A,
- UNC13A,
- UNC13B, and
- YWHAH.
