= RAB3A =

Protein-coding gene in the species Homo sapiens

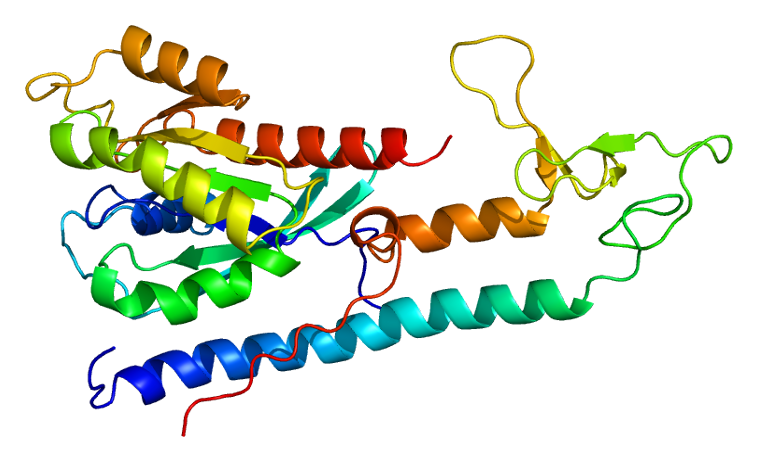

Identifiers
- Aliases: RAB3A, member RAS oncogene family
- External IDs: OMIM: 179490; MGI: 97843; GeneCards: RAB3A
Enzyme activity
| EC # | BRENDA | ExPASy | KEGG | MetaCyc |
|---|---|---|---|---|
| 3.6.5.2 | ↗ | ↗ | ↗ | ↗ |

Gene location (Human)
| Chr. | Chromosome 19 (human) |
| Band | 19p13.11 | Start | 18,196,784 bp |
| Band | 19p13.11 | End | 18,204,042 bp |

Gene location (Mouse)
| Chr. | Chromosome 8 (mouse) |
| Band | 8 B3.3|8 34.15 cM | Start | 71,207,328 bp |
| Band | 8 B3.3|8 34.15 cM | End | 71,211,323 bp |
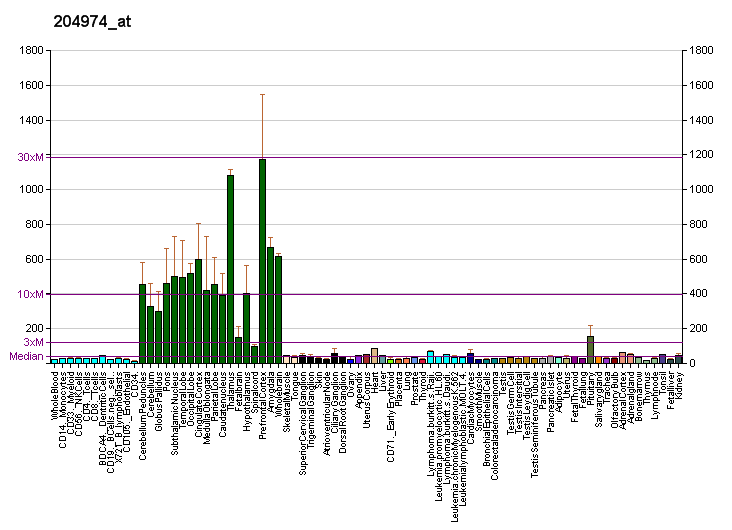
RNA expression pattern
| Bgee | Human / Mouse (ortholog); Top expressed in: right frontal lobe; right hemisphere of cerebellum; Brodmann area 9; prefrontal cortex; nucleus accumbens; amygdala; putamen; hypothalamus; cingulate gyrus; spinal ganglia / Top expressed in: primary visual cortex; superior frontal gyrus; dentate gyrus of hippocampal formation granule cell; cerebellar cortex; central gray substance of midbrain; subiculum; dorsomedial hypothalamic nucleus; prefrontal cortex; habenula; primary motor cortex; More reference expression data |
| BioGPS | More reference expression data |
Gene ontology
| Molecular function | nucleotide binding; ATPase binding; GTP binding; myosin V binding; protein C-terminus binding; protein binding; ATPase activator activity; GTP-dependent protein binding; GTPase activity; GDP-dissociation inhibitor binding |
| Cellular component | extracellular vesicle; endosome; clathrin-sculpted monoamine transport vesicle membrane; membrane; synaptic vesicle; plasma membrane; clathrin-sculpted gamma-aminobutyric acid transport vesicle membrane; clathrin-sculpted acetylcholine transport vesicle membrane; axon; terminal bouton; acrosomal vesicle; intracellular organelle; clathrin-sculpted glutamate transport vesicle membrane; cytosol; secretory granule membrane; anchored component of synaptic vesicle membrane; vesicle; protein-containing complex; presynaptic active zone; secretory granule; perinuclear region of cytoplasm |
| Biological process | respiratory system process; positive regulation of ATP-dependent activity; axonogenesis; lung development; synaptic vesicle exocytosis; regulation of short-term neuronal synaptic plasticity; evoked neurotransmitter secretion; mitochondrion organization; response to electrical stimulus; post-embryonic development; constitutive secretory pathway; maintenance of presynaptic active zone structure; glutamate secretion; regulation of exocytosis; regulation of synaptic vesicle fusion to presynaptic active zone membrane; neuromuscular synaptic transmission; synaptic vesicle recycling; sensory perception of touch; protein transport; positive regulation of exocytosis; synaptic vesicle maturation; neurotransmitter secretion; positive regulation of regulated secretory pathway; exocytosis; neutrophil degranulation; post-translational protein modification; transport; intracellular protein transport; vesicle docking involved in exocytosis; protein secretion; Rab protein signal transduction; protein localization to plasma membrane; plasma membrane repair; regulation of synaptic vesicle priming; synaptic vesicle transport; acrosomal vesicle exocytosis; regulation of synaptic vesicle exocytosis; calcium-ion regulated exocytosis; synaptic vesicle clustering |
Sources:Amigo / QuickGO
Orthologs
| Databases | NCBI: entry; OMA: entry |
| Species | Human | Mouse |
| Entrez | 5864 | 19339 |
| Ensembl | ENSG00000105649 | ENSMUSG00000031840 |
| UniProt | P20336 | P63011 |
| RefSeq (mRNA) | NM_002866 | NM_001166399; NM_009001; NM_001328047; NM_001378892; NM_001378893 |
| RefSeq (protein) | NP_002857; NP_002857.1 | NP_001159871; NP_001314976; NP_033027; NP_001365821; NP_001365822 |
| Location (UCSC) | Chr 19: 18.2 – 18.2 Mb | Chr 8: 71.21 – 71.21 Mb |
| PubMed search |
- Wikidata
| View/Edit Human | View/Edit Mouse |

Ras-related protein Rab-3A is a protein that in humans is encoded by the RAB3A gene. It is involved in calcium-triggered exocytosis in neurons.

== Interactions ==
RAB3A has been shown to interact with:

- RIMS1,
- UNC13A,
- RPH3A, and
- CHM.
