= DOC2B =

Protein-coding gene in the species Homo sapiens

Identifiers
- Aliases: DOC2B, DOC2BL, double C2 domain beta
- External IDs: OMIM: 604568; MGI: 1100497; GeneCards: DOC2B

Gene location (Human)
Chr.	Chromosome 17 (human)
Band	17p13.3	Start	142,789 bp
Band	17p13.3	End	181,650 bp

Gene location (Mouse)
Chr.	Chromosome 11 (mouse)
Band	11|11 B5	Start	75,659,792 bp
Band	11|11 B5	End	75,686,875 bp
RNA expression pattern
Bgee	Human / Mouse (ortholog); Top expressed in: right hemisphere of cerebellum; nucleus accumbens; hippocampus proper; anterior cingulate cortex; putamen; right frontal lobe; subcutaneous adipose tissue; superior frontal gyrus; caudate nucleus; temporal lobe / Top expressed in: subiculum; olfactory tubercle; ventromedial nucleus; anterior amygdaloid area; lobe of cerebellum; cerebellar vermis; nucleus accumbens; ventral tegmental area; lumbar subsegment of spinal cord; dorsomedial hypothalamic nucleus; More reference expression data
BioGPS	n/a
Gene ontology
Molecular function	calcium-dependent phospholipid binding; clathrin binding; calcium ion binding; syntaxin binding
Cellular component	cytoplasm; SNARE complex; membrane; presynapse; plasma membrane; exocytic vesicle; synapse
Biological process	protein localization; positive regulation of vesicle fusion; positive regulation of insulin secretion; positive regulation of calcium ion-dependent exocytosis; vesicle fusion; calcium ion-regulated exocytosis of neurotransmitter; regulation of calcium ion-dependent exocytosis; spontaneous neurotransmitter secretion
Sources:Amigo / QuickGO
Orthologs
Databases	NCBI: entry; OMA: entry
Species	Human	Mouse
Entrez	8447	13447
Ensembl	ENSG00000272670; ENSG00000272636	ENSMUSG00000020848
UniProt	Q14184	P70169
RefSeq (mRNA)	NM_003585	NM_007873
RefSeq (protein)	NP_003576	NP_031899
Location (UCSC)	Chr 17: 0.14 – 0.18 Mb	Chr 11: 75.66 – 75.69 Mb
PubMed search
- Wikidata
View/Edit Human	View/Edit Mouse

Double C2-like domain-containing protein beta is a protein that in humans is encoded by the DOC2B gene.

== Function ==
There are at least two protein isoforms of the Double C2 protein, namely alpha (DOC2A) and beta (DOC2B), which contain two C2-like domains. DOC2A and DOC2B are encoded by different genes; these genes are at times confused with the unrelated DAB2 gene which was initially named DOC-2. In mouse and rat tissue, Doc2b enhances Ca^{2+}-dependent exocytosis in adipocytes, chromaffin cells of the adrenal gland and beta cells in the pancreas. In the central nervous system, Doc2b contributes to the spontaneous release of neurotransmitters, which was thought to be acting as a high-affinity Ca^{2+} sensor for exocytosis of synaptic vesicles However, further work has shown that while DOC2b is both important for spontaneous exocytosis of synaptic vesicles and binds Calcium, it does not in fact change the calcium dependence of spontaneous synaptic vesicle release and thus can not be the calcium sensor for this process.
