= PTPRD =

Protein-coding gene in humans

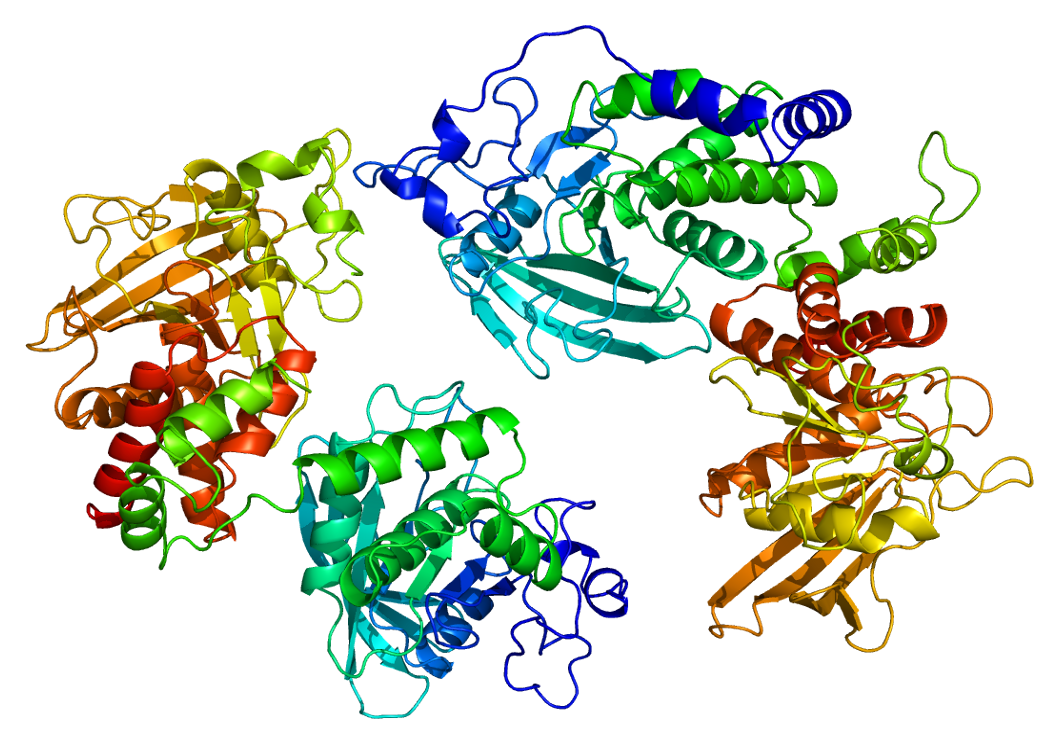

Identifiers
- Aliases: PTPRD, HPTP, HPTPD, HPTPDELTA, PTPD, RPTPDELTA, protein tyrosine phosphatase, receptor type D, protein tyrosine phosphatase receptor type D, R-PTP-delta
- External IDs: OMIM: 601598; MGI: 97812; GeneCards: PTPRD
Available structures
PDB	Ortholog search: PDBe RCSB
PDB	List of PDB id codes 1X5Z, 2DLH, 2YD6, 2YD7, 4RCA
Enzyme activity
EC #	BRENDA	ExPASy	KEGG	MetaCyc
3.1.3.48	↗	↗	↗	↗

Gene location (Human)
Chr.	Chromosome 9 (human)
Band	9p24.1-p23	Start	8,314,246 bp
Band	9p24.1-p23	End	10,613,002 bp

Gene location (Mouse)
Chr.	Chromosome 4 (mouse)
Band	4 C3|4 36.94 cM	Start	75,941,238 bp
Band	4 C3|4 36.94 cM	End	78,211,961 bp
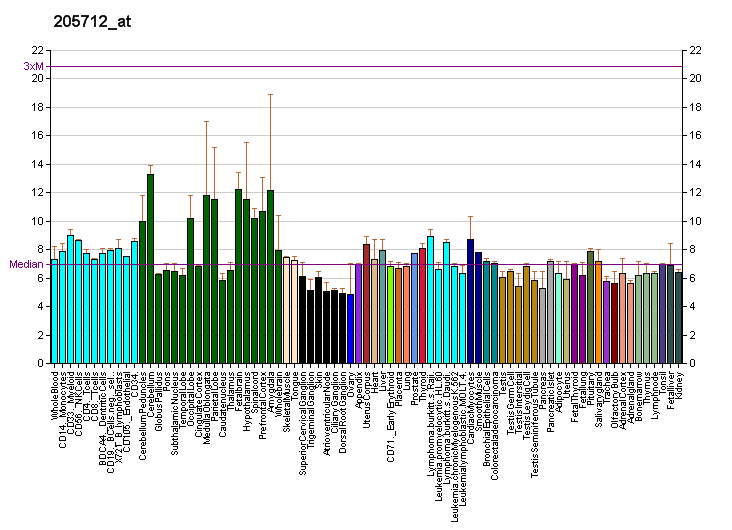

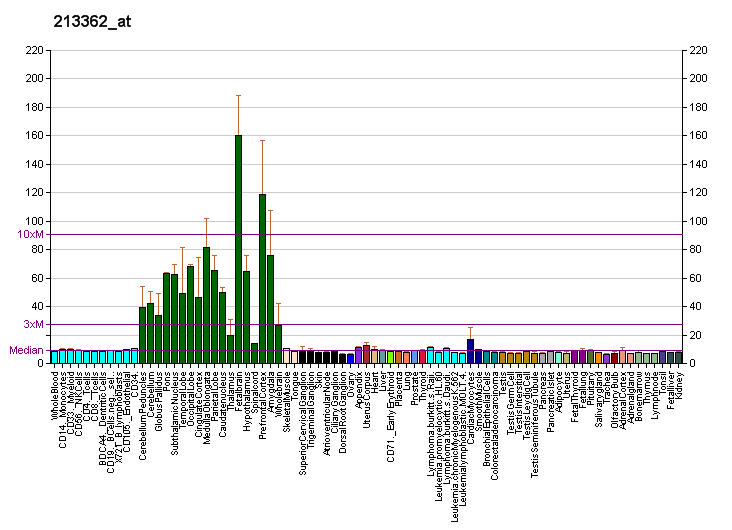

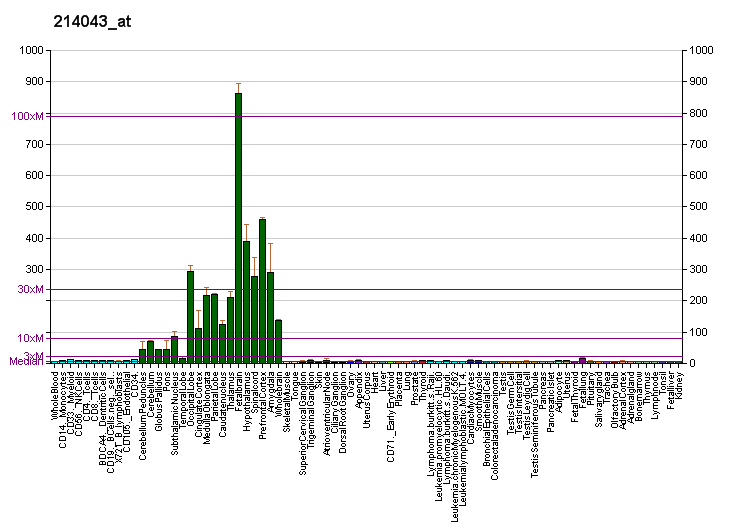
RNA expression pattern
Bgee	Human / Mouse (ortholog); Top expressed in: right hemisphere of cerebellum; C1 segment; ganglionic eminence; Brodmann area 9; prefrontal cortex; right frontal lobe; anterior cingulate cortex; Descending thoracic aorta; rectum; hypothalamus / Top expressed in: saccule; internal carotid artery; external carotid artery; facial motor nucleus; anterior horn of spinal cord; body of femur; barrel cortex; lateral geniculate nucleus; substantia nigra; epithelium of lens; More reference expression data
BioGPS	More reference expression data
Gene ontology
Molecular function	transmembrane receptor protein tyrosine phosphatase activity; phosphoprotein phosphatase activity; protein tyrosine phosphatase activity; hydrolase activity; signaling receptor binding; cell adhesion molecule binding; phosphatase activity; protein binding
Cellular component	extracellular exosome; membrane; integral component of membrane; integral component of plasma membrane; plasma membrane; glutamatergic synapse
Biological process	presynaptic membrane assembly; transmembrane receptor protein tyrosine phosphatase signaling pathway; neuron differentiation; positive regulation of dendrite morphogenesis; protein dephosphorylation; phosphate-containing compound metabolic process; heterophilic cell-cell adhesion via plasma membrane cell adhesion molecules; dephosphorylation; peptidyl-tyrosine dephosphorylation; positive regulation of synapse assembly; regulation of postsynaptic density assembly; trans-synaptic signaling by trans-synaptic complex; synaptic membrane adhesion; regulation of presynapse assembly
Sources:Amigo / QuickGO
Orthologs
Databases	NCBI: entry; OMA: entry
Species	Human	Mouse
Entrez	5789	19266
Ensembl	ENSG00000153707; ENSG00000282932	ENSMUSG00000028399
UniProt	P23468; Q3KPI9	Q64487
RefSeq (mRNA)	NM_001040712; NM_001171025; NM_002839; NM_130391; NM_130392 NM_130393; NM_001377946; NM_001377947; NM_001377958; NM_001378058	NM_001014288; NM_011211; NM_001352628; NM_001352629; NM_001352630 NM_001368991; NM_001368992; NM_001368993
RefSeq (protein)	NP_001035802; NP_001164496; NP_002830; NP_569075; NP_569076 NP_569077; NP_001364875; NP_001364876; NP_001364887; NP_001364987; NP_569077.2	NP_035341; NP_001339557; NP_001339558; NP_001339559; NP_001355920 NP_001355921; NP_001355922
Location (UCSC)	Chr 9: 8.31 – 10.61 Mb	Chr 4: 75.94 – 78.21 Mb
PubMed search
- Wikidata
View/Edit Human	View/Edit Mouse

Receptor-type tyrosine-protein phosphatase delta is an enzyme that, in humans, is encoded by the PTPRD gene.

== Function ==
The protein encoded by this gene is a member of the protein tyrosine phosphatase (PTP) family. PTPs are known to be signaling molecules that regulate a variety of cellular processes including cell growth, differentiation, mitotic cycle, and oncogenic transformation. This PTP contains an extracellular region, a single transmembrane segment and two tandem intracytoplasmic catalytic domains, thus represents a receptor-type PTP. The extracellular region of this protein is composed of three Ig-like and eight fibronectin type III-like domains. Studies of the similar genes in chick and fly suggest the role of this PTP is in promoting neurite growth, and regulating neurons axon guidance. Multiple tissue specific alternatively spliced transcript variants of this gene have been reported.

== Ligand binding ==
PTPRD is the orexigenic receptor of asprosin, a hormone that is produced by the C-terminal cleavage of profibrillin from the FBN1 gene. In mice, asprosin acts on an olfactory receptor, Olfr734 in the liver to regulate its gluconeogenic effects. However, PTPRD has been identified as the neural receptor for asprosin. Genetic ablation of PTPRD results in extreme leanness and loss of appetite. More specifically, resistance to diet-induced obesity can occur through the loss of PTPRD in AgRP neurons. When asprosin binds to PTPRD, this leads to the de-phosphorylation and de-activation of Stat3.

== Clinical significance ==
PTPRD is highly expressed throughout the entire brain, especially in the cerebellum and cerebellar hemisphere. PTPRD is also highly expressed in the coronary arteries, the aorta, and the ovaries. Mutations in the PTPRD gene are also associated with autism, obsessive–compulsive disorder, and breast cancer.

== Interactions ==
PTPRD has been shown to interact with PTPRS and liprin-alpha-1.
