= RAB3B =

Protein-coding gene in humans

Identifiers
- Aliases: RAB3B, member RAS oncogene family
- External IDs: OMIM: 179510; MGI: 1917158; GeneCards: RAB3B
Available structures
PDB	Ortholog search: PDBe RCSB
PDB	List of PDB id codes 3DZ8
Enzyme activity
EC #	BRENDA	ExPASy	KEGG	MetaCyc
3.6.5.2	↗	↗	↗	↗

Gene location (Human)
Chr.	Chromosome 1 (human)
Band	1p32.3	Start	51,907,956 bp
Band	1p32.3	End	51,990,700 bp

Gene location (Mouse)
Chr.	Chromosome 4 (mouse)
Band	4|4 C7	Start	108,736,260 bp
Band	4|4 C7	End	108,800,521 bp
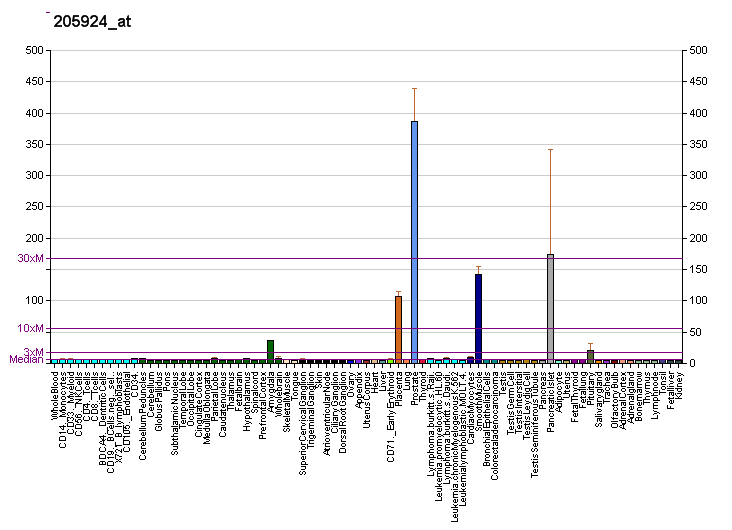

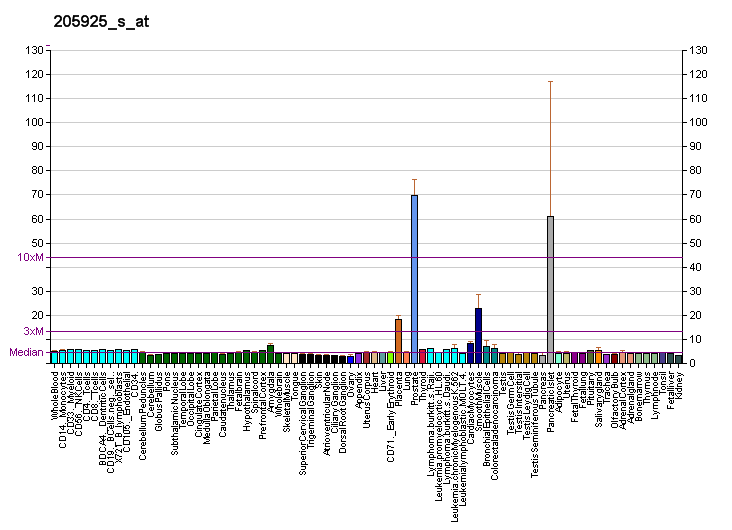
RNA expression pattern
Bgee	Human / Mouse (ortholog); Top expressed in: islet of Langerhans; stromal cell of endometrium; beta cell; gonad; entorhinal cortex; anterior pituitary; hypothalamus; superior vestibular nucleus; placenta; testicle / Top expressed in: facial motor nucleus; superior frontal gyrus; zygote; arcuate nucleus; paraventricular nucleus of hypothalamus; subiculum; primary visual cortex; supraoptic nucleus; dorsomedial hypothalamic nucleus; primary oocyte; More reference expression data
BioGPS	More reference expression data
Gene ontology
Molecular function	nucleotide binding; GDP binding; GTP binding; myosin V binding; protein binding; GTP-dependent protein binding; GTPase activity
Cellular component	cytoplasm; vesicle; cytosol; membrane; synaptic vesicle; plasma membrane; secretory granule; perinuclear region of cytoplasm; extracellular exosome; anchored component of synaptic vesicle membrane; endosome; Golgi apparatus; dopaminergic synapse
Biological process	antigen processing and presentation; positive regulation of dopamine uptake involved in synaptic transmission; peptidyl-cysteine methylation; regulation of exocytosis; regulation of vesicle size; protein transport; transport; intracellular protein transport; vesicle docking involved in exocytosis; protein secretion; Rab protein signal transduction; protein localization to plasma membrane; regulation of synaptic vesicle cycle
Sources:Amigo / QuickGO
Orthologs
Databases	NCBI: entry; OMA: entry
Species	Human	Mouse
Entrez	5865	69908
Ensembl	ENSG00000169213	ENSMUSG00000003411
UniProt	P20337	Q9CZT8
RefSeq (mRNA)	NM_002867	NM_023537
RefSeq (protein)	NP_002858	NP_076026
Location (UCSC)	Chr 1: 51.91 – 51.99 Mb	Chr 4: 108.74 – 108.8 Mb
PubMed search
- Wikidata
View/Edit Human	View/Edit Mouse

Ras-related protein Rab-3B is a protein that in humans is encoded by the RAB3B gene.

== Interactions ==
RAB3B has been shown to interact with RPH3A.
