= PPFIBP1 =

Protein-coding gene in the species Homo sapiens

Identifiers
- Aliases: PPFIBP1, L2, SGT2, hSGT2, hSgt2p, PPFIA binding protein 1
- External IDs: OMIM: 603141; MGI: 1914783; GeneCards: PPFIBP1
Available structures
PDB	Ortholog search: PDBe RCSB
PDB	List of PDB id codes 3TAD

Gene location (Human)
Chr.	Chromosome 12 (human)
Band	12p11.23-p11.22	Start	27,523,431 bp
Band	12p11.23-p11.22	End	27,695,564 bp

Gene location (Mouse)
Chr.	Chromosome 6 (mouse)
Band	6|6 G3	Start	146,789,985 bp
Band	6|6 G3	End	146,933,523 bp
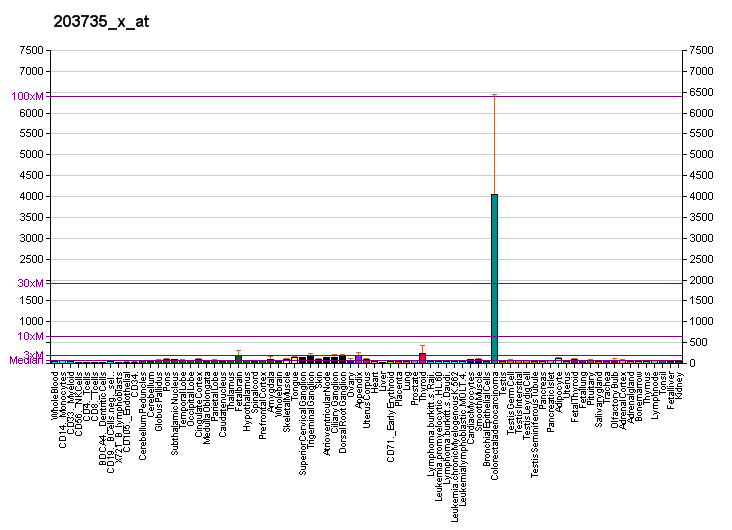

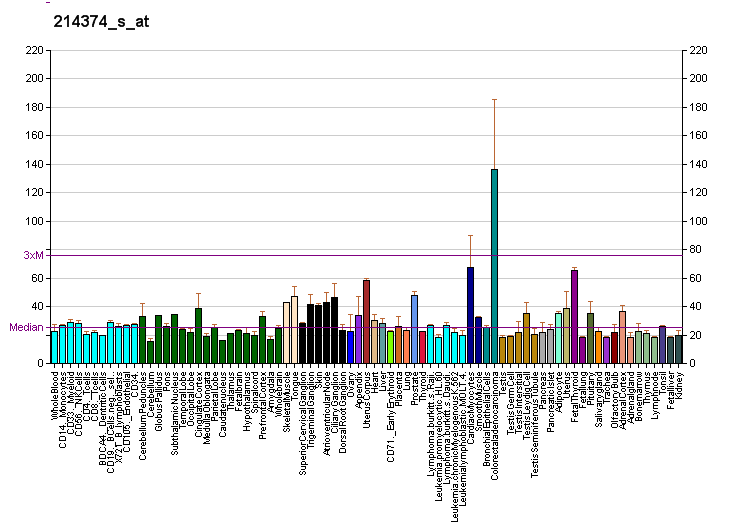

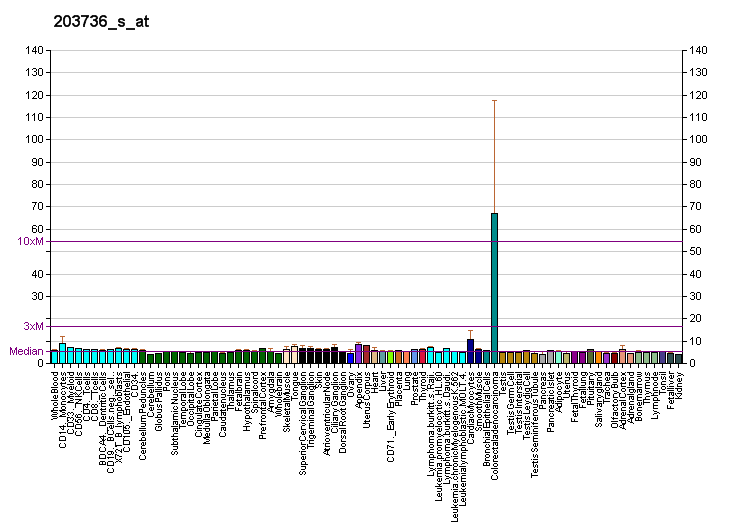
RNA expression pattern
Bgee	Human / Mouse (ortholog); Top expressed in: tendon of biceps brachii; sural nerve; buccal mucosa cell; epithelium of colon; left ovary; Achilles tendon; trigeminal ganglion; ventricle of the heart; left ventricle; right ventricle / Top expressed in: tail of embryo; cumulus cell; hand; otolith organ; utricle; endothelial cell of lymphatic vessel; cervix; conjunctival fornix; seminal vesicula; semi-lunar valve; More reference expression data
BioGPS	More reference expression data
Gene ontology
Molecular function	cadherin binding
Cellular component	plasma membrane; focal adhesion; cytosol
Biological process	cell adhesion
Sources:Amigo / QuickGO
Orthologs
Databases	NCBI: entry; OMA: entry
Species	Human	Mouse
Entrez	8496	67533
Ensembl	ENSG00000110841	ENSMUSG00000016487
UniProt	Q86W92	Q8C8U0
RefSeq (mRNA)	NM_001198915; NM_001198916; NM_003622; NM_177444	NM_001170433; NM_026221; NM_001355728; NM_001355729
RefSeq (protein)	NP_001185844; NP_001185845; NP_003613; NP_803193	NP_001163904; NP_080497; NP_001342657; NP_001342658
Location (UCSC)	Chr 12: 27.52 – 27.7 Mb	Chr 6: 146.79 – 146.93 Mb
PubMed search
- Wikidata
View/Edit Human	View/Edit Mouse

Liprin-beta-1 is a protein that in humans is encoded by the PPFIBP1 gene.

The protein encoded by this gene is a member of the LAR protein-tyrosine phosphatase-interacting protein (liprin) family. Liprins interact with members of LAR family of transmembrane protein tyrosine phosphatases, which are known to be important for axon guidance and mammary gland development. It has been proposed that liprins are multivalent proteins that form complex structures and act as scaffolds for the recruitment and anchoring of LAR family of tyrosine phosphatases. This protein was found to interact with S100A4, a calcium-binding protein related to tumor invasiveness and metastasis. In vitro experiment demonstrated that the interaction inhibited the phosphorylation of this protein by protein kinase C and protein kinase CK2. Alternatively spliced transcript variants encoding distinct isoforms have been reported.

== Interactions ==
PPFIBP1 has been shown to interact with liprin-alpha-1.
