= DOC2A =

Protein-coding gene in the species Homo sapiens

Identifiers
- Aliases: DOC2A, Doc2, double C2 domain alpha
- External IDs: OMIM: 604567; MGI: 109446; GeneCards: DOC2A
Available structures
PDB	Ortholog search: PDBe RCSB
PDB	List of PDB id codes 4MJJ

Gene location (Human)
Chr.	Chromosome 16 (human)
Band	16p11.2	Start	30,005,514 bp
Band	16p11.2	End	30,023,270 bp

Gene location (Mouse)
Chr.	Chromosome 7 (mouse)
Band	7|7 F3	Start	126,446,588 bp
Band	7|7 F3	End	126,451,877 bp
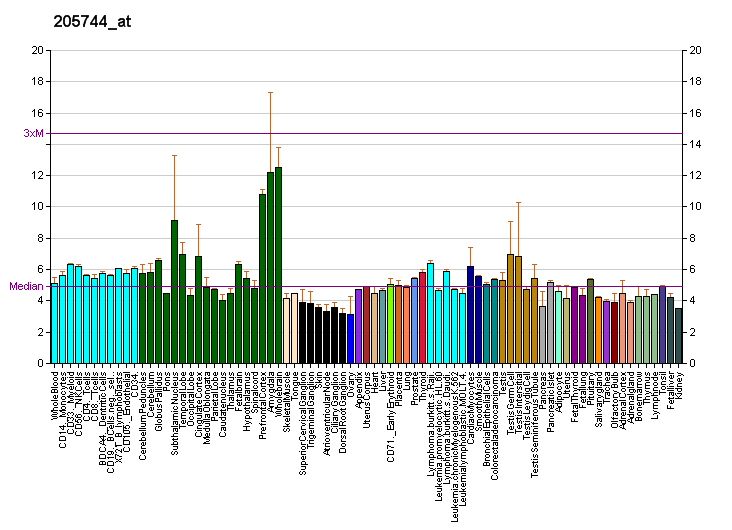
RNA expression pattern
Bgee	Human / Mouse (ortholog); Top expressed in: right frontal lobe; right hemisphere of cerebellum; Brodmann area 9; left testis; right testis; anterior cingulate cortex; prefrontal cortex; right uterine tube; amygdala; mucosa of transverse colon / Top expressed in: ventromedial nucleus; cingulate gyrus; primary motor cortex; motor neuron; lumbar subsegment of spinal cord; anterior amygdaloid area; piriform cortex; barrel cortex; prefrontal cortex; paraventricular nucleus of hypothalamus; More reference expression data
BioGPS	More reference expression data
Gene ontology
Molecular function	calcium-dependent phospholipid binding; clathrin binding; calcium ion binding; syntaxin binding; protein binding
Cellular component	neuron projection; lysosome; synapse; synaptic vesicle membrane; membrane; cytoplasmic vesicle; plasma membrane; nucleus; nucleolus; cell junction; exocytic vesicle; extrinsic component of synaptic vesicle membrane
Biological process	nervous system development; regulation of calcium ion-dependent exocytosis; synaptic vesicle exocytosis; exocytosis; chemical synaptic transmission; calcium ion-regulated exocytosis of neurotransmitter; vesicle fusion; spontaneous neurotransmitter secretion
Sources:Amigo / QuickGO
Orthologs
Databases	NCBI: entry; OMA: entry
Species	Human	Mouse
Entrez	8448	13446
Ensembl	ENSG00000149927	ENSMUSG00000052301
UniProt	Q14183	Q7TNF0
RefSeq (mRNA)	NM_001282062; NM_001282063; NM_001282068; NM_003586	NM_010069; NM_001368355; NM_001368356; NM_001368357; NM_001368358
RefSeq (protein)	NP_001268991; NP_001268992; NP_001268997; NP_003577	NP_034199; NP_001355284; NP_001355285; NP_001355286; NP_001355287
Location (UCSC)	Chr 16: 30.01 – 30.02 Mb	Chr 7: 126.45 – 126.45 Mb
PubMed search
- Wikidata
View/Edit Human	View/Edit Mouse

Double C2-like domain-containing protein alpha is a protein that in humans is encoded by the DOC2A gene.

There are at least two protein isoforms of the Double C2 protein, namely alpha (DOC2A) and beta (DOC2B), which contain two C2-like domains. DOC2A and DOC2B are encoded by different genes; these genes are at times confused with the unrelated DAB2 gene which was initially named DOC-2. DOC2A is mainly expressed in brain and is suggested to be involved in Ca^{2+}-dependent neurotransmitter release.

== Interactions ==
DOC2A has been shown to interact with UNC13B and UNC13A.
