= RPH3A =

Gene of the species Homo sapiens

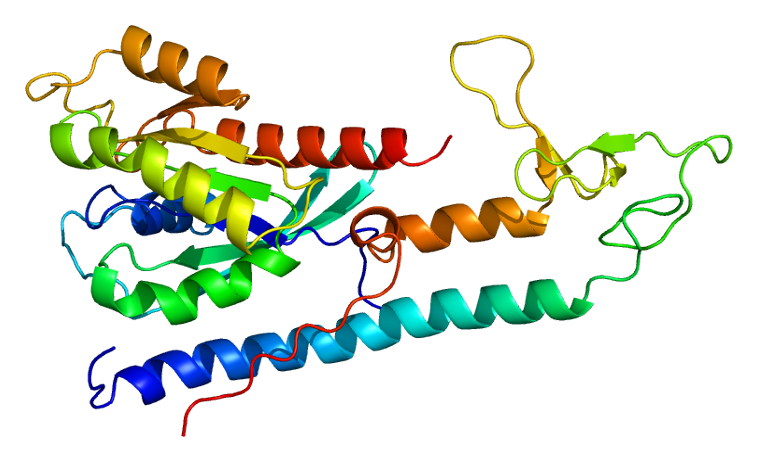

Identifiers
- Aliases: RPH3A
- External IDs: OMIM: 612159; MGI: 102788; GeneCards: RPH3A

Gene location (Human)
Chr.	Chromosome 12 (human)
Band	n/a	Start	112,570,380 bp
Band	n/a	End	112,898,881 bp

Gene location (Mouse)
Chr.	Chromosome 5 (mouse)
Band	5|5 F	Start	121,078,562 bp
Band	5|5 F	End	121,148,155 bp
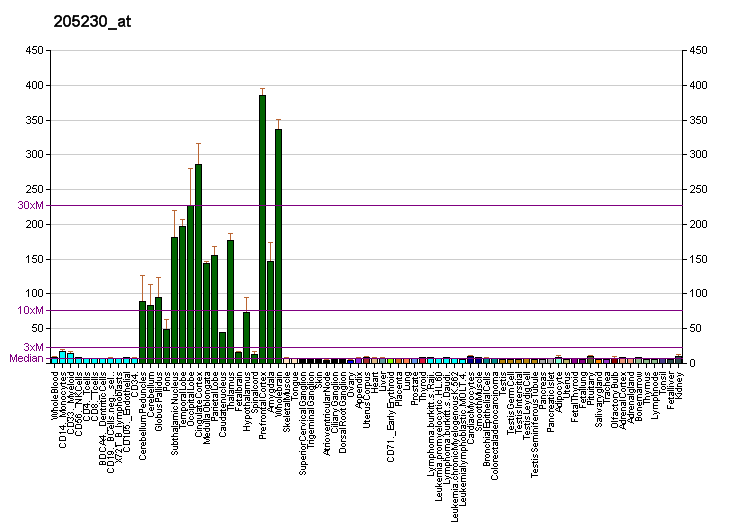
RNA expression pattern
Bgee	Human / Mouse (ortholog); n/a / Top expressed in: primary visual cortex; superior frontal gyrus; cerebellar cortex; dentate gyrus of hippocampal formation granule cell; dorsal tegmental nucleus; superior colliculus; anterior horn of spinal cord; central gray substance of midbrain; medial vestibular nucleus; zygote
BioGPS	More reference expression data
Gene ontology
Molecular function	protein binding; metal ion binding; phosphatidylinositol phosphate binding; lipid binding; clathrin binding; syntaxin binding; calcium-dependent phospholipid binding; phosphatidylinositol-4,5-bisphosphate binding; zinc ion binding; inositol 1,4,5 trisphosphate binding; selenium binding; phosphate ion binding; calcium ion binding; protein-containing complex binding
Cellular component	synapse; cell junction; membrane; Golgi apparatus; synaptic vesicle membrane; secretory granule; plasma membrane; synaptic vesicle; neuron projection; extrinsic component of membrane; cytosol; protein-containing complex; cytoplasmic vesicle; cell projection; dendritic spine; postsynaptic membrane; intracellular anatomical structure
Biological process	protein transport; intracellular protein transport; calcium ion-regulated exocytosis of neurotransmitter; vesicle fusion; regulation of calcium ion-dependent exocytosis; spontaneous neurotransmitter secretion
Sources:Amigo / QuickGO
Orthologs
Databases	NCBI: entry; OMA: entry
Species	Human	Mouse
Entrez	22895	19894
Ensembl	ENSG00000089169	ENSMUSG00000029608
UniProt	Q9Y2J0	P47708
RefSeq (mRNA)	NM_001143854; NM_014954	NM_011286; NM_001302344; NM_001302345
RefSeq (protein)	NP_001137326; NP_055769; NP_001334881; NP_001334882; NP_001334883 NP_001334884	NP_001289273; NP_001289274; NP_035416
Location (UCSC)	Chr 12: 112.57 – 112.9 Mb	Chr 5: 121.08 – 121.15 Mb
PubMed search
- Wikidata
View/Edit Human	View/Edit Mouse

Rabphilin-3A is a protein that in humans is encoded by the RPH3A gene. It contains two C2 domains and binds calcium ions at low micromolar concentration. Rabphilin was shown to regulate neurotransmitter release in hippocampal neurons after neurons had an increased synaptic activity and their release rate was depressed.

== Interactions ==
RPH3A has been shown to interact with RAB3A, RAB3B and CASK.
