= TLX2 =

Human protein-coding gene

Identifiers
- Aliases: TLX2, HOX11L1, NCX, T-cell leukemia homeobox 2, T cell leukemia homeobox 2
- External IDs: OMIM: 604240; MGI: 1350935; GeneCards: TLX2
Available structures
PDB	Ortholog search: PDBe RCSB
PDB	List of PDB id codes 3A03

Gene location (Human)
Chr.	Chromosome 2 (human)
Band	2p13.1	Start	74,513,463 bp
Band	2p13.1	End	74,517,148 bp

Gene location (Mouse)
Chr.	Chromosome 6 (mouse)
Band	6 C3|6 35.94 cM	Start	83,045,305 bp
Band	6 C3|6 35.94 cM	End	83,047,274 bp
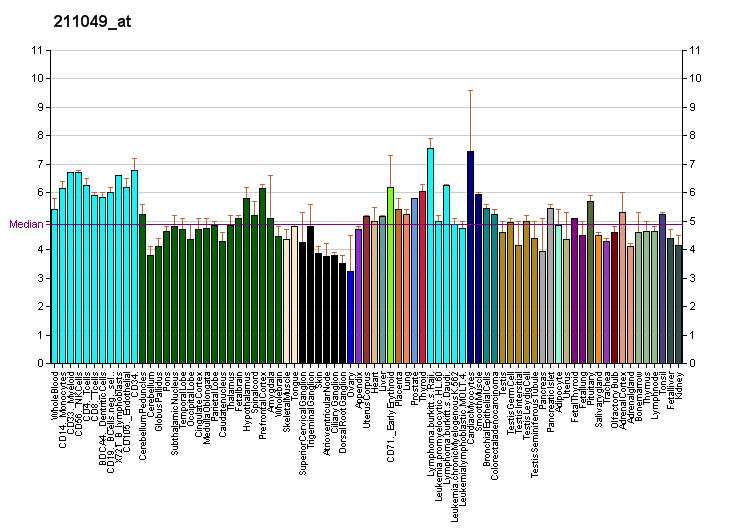

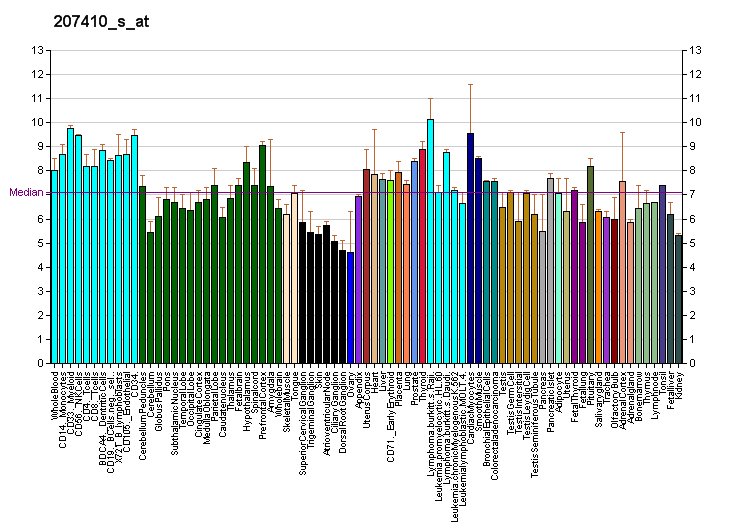
RNA expression pattern
Bgee	Human / Mouse (ortholog); Top expressed in: gonad; transverse colon; mucosa of transverse colon; muscle layer of sigmoid colon; right testis; left testis; primary visual cortex; rectum; duodenum; appendix / Top expressed in: lumbar spinal ganglion; adrenal medulla; autonomic nervous system; glossopharyngeal ganglion; parasympathetic nervous system; female urethra; male urethra; autonomic ganglion; sympathetic nervous system; cervical ganglion; More reference expression data
BioGPS	More reference expression data
Gene ontology
Molecular function	DNA binding; DNA-binding transcription activator activity, RNA polymerase II-specific; sequence-specific DNA binding; DNA-binding transcription factor activity, RNA polymerase II-specific; DNA-binding transcription factor activity
Cellular component	cytoplasm; nucleus; cellular component
Biological process	multicellular organism development; enteric nervous system development; mesoderm formation; regulation of transcription, DNA-templated; negative regulation of dendrite morphogenesis; transcription, DNA-templated; transcription by RNA polymerase II; positive regulation of transcription by RNA polymerase II
Sources:Amigo / QuickGO
Orthologs
Databases	NCBI: entry; OMA: entry
Species	Human	Mouse
Entrez	3196	21909
Ensembl	ENSG00000115297	ENSMUSG00000068327
UniProt	O43763	Q61663
RefSeq (mRNA)	NM_016170; NM_001534	NM_009392
RefSeq (protein)	NP_057254	NP_033418
Location (UCSC)	Chr 2: 74.51 – 74.52 Mb	Chr 6: 83.05 – 83.05 Mb
PubMed search
- Wikidata
View/Edit Human	View/Edit Mouse

T-cell leukemia homeobox protein 2 is a protein that in humans is encoded by the TLX2 gene.

== Interactions ==
TLX2 has been shown to interact with YWHAH.
