= YWHAH =

Protein-coding gene in the species Homo sapiens

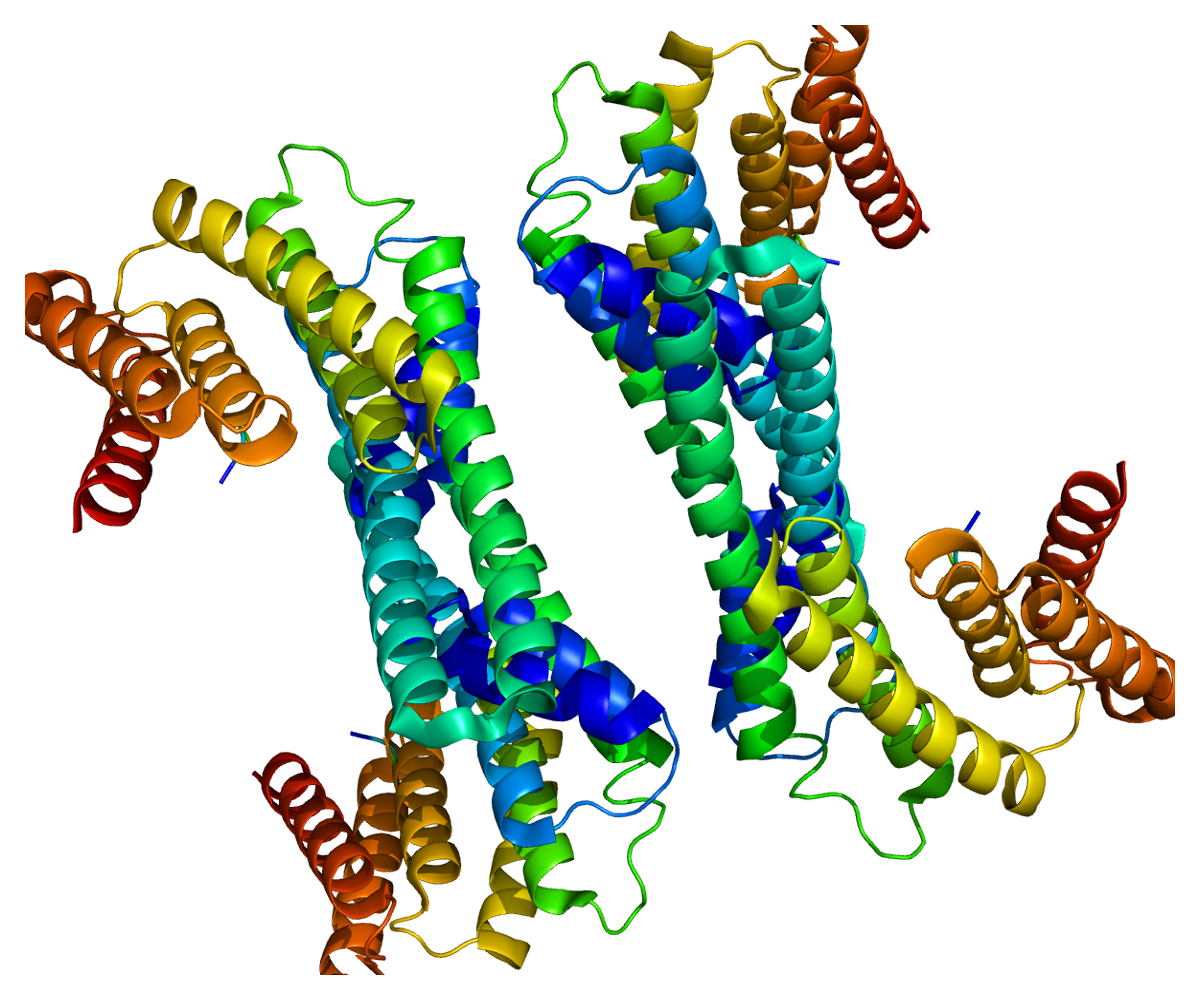

Identifiers
- Aliases: YWHAH, YWHA1, tyrosine 3-monooxygenase/tryptophan 5-monooxygenase activation protein eta
- External IDs: OMIM: 113508; MGI: 109194; GeneCards: YWHAH
Available structures
PDB	Ortholog search: PDBe RCSB
PDB	List of PDB id codes 2C63, 2C74

Gene location (Human)
Chr.	Chromosome 22 (human)
Band	22q12.3	Start	31,944,522 bp
Band	22q12.3	End	31,957,603 bp

Gene location (Mouse)
Chr.	Chromosome 5 (mouse)
Band	5|5 B1	Start	33,176,160 bp
Band	5|5 B1	End	33,185,310 bp
RNA expression pattern
Bgee	Human / Mouse (ortholog); Top expressed in: frontal pole; Brodmann area 10; paraflocculus of cerebellum; middle frontal gyrus; right frontal lobe; cingulate gyrus; anterior cingulate cortex; dorsolateral prefrontal cortex; orbitofrontal cortex; amygdala / Top expressed in: primary visual cortex; dentate gyrus of hippocampal formation granule cell; cerebellar cortex; hippocampus proper; superior frontal gyrus; hypothalamus; olfactory bulb; neural layer of retina; neural tube; mesencephalon; More reference expression data
BioGPS	n/a
Gene ontology
Molecular function	sodium channel regulator activity; insulin-like growth factor receptor binding; transmembrane transporter binding; protein domain specific binding; protein binding; glucocorticoid receptor binding; protein heterodimerization activity; enzyme binding; actin binding; identical protein binding
Cellular component	cytoplasm; cytosol; intercalated disc; plasma membrane; extracellular exosome; cytoplasmic vesicle membrane; mitochondrion; presynapse; glutamatergic synapse
Biological process	regulation of neuron differentiation; glucocorticoid catabolic process; membrane depolarization during action potential; substantia nigra development; regulation of sodium ion transport; regulation of synaptic plasticity; positive regulation of transcription, DNA-templated; positive regulation of protein insertion into mitochondrial membrane involved in apoptotic signaling pathway; negative regulation of dendrite morphogenesis; regulation of sodium ion transmembrane transporter activity; membrane organization; intracellular protein transport; glucocorticoid receptor signaling pathway
Sources:Amigo / QuickGO
Orthologs
Databases	NCBI: entry; OMA: entry
Species	Human	Mouse
Entrez	7533	22629
Ensembl	ENSG00000128245	ENSMUSG00000018965
UniProt	Q04917	P68510
RefSeq (mRNA)	NM_003405	NM_011738
RefSeq (protein)	NP_003396	NP_035868
Location (UCSC)	Chr 22: 31.94 – 31.96 Mb	Chr 5: 33.18 – 33.19 Mb
PubMed search
- Wikidata
View/Edit Human	View/Edit Mouse

14-3-3 protein eta also referred to as 14-3-3η is a protein that in humans is encoded by the YWHAH gene.

== Function ==
This gene product belongs to the 14-3-3 family of proteins that are normally intracellular in nature and help to mediate signal transduction by binding to phosphoserine-containing proteins. This highly conserved protein family is found in both plants and mammals, and this protein is 99% identical to the mouse, rat and bovine orthologs. This gene contains a 7 bp repeat sequence in its 5' UTR, and changes in the number of this repeat has been associated with early-onset schizophrenia.

== Protein-protein interactions ==
YWHAH has been shown to interact with:

- C-Raf,
- CDC25B,
- EPB41L3,
- Glucocorticoid receptor,
- KIF5B,
- KLC3,
- Phosphoinositide-dependent kinase-1,
- RIMS1,
- RIMS2,
- TLX2,
- TNFAIP3, and
- ZFP36.

== Externalization ==
14-3-3n is normally intracellular. Two main mechanisms resulting in the release of 14-3-3η into the extracellular environment have been reported:

1. exosomal mediated process; and
2. necroptosis;

14-3-3 proteins are components of small extracellular vesicles that are secreted by most, if not all cells. Tumor necrosis factor alpha stimulation of macrophages, but not IL-6, promotes the secretion of 14-3-3η into the extracellular space through a TNF alpha-dependent necroptotic mechanism.

== Role in rheumatoid arthritis ==
A 2021 systematic literature review published by authors from the University Hospitals of Morecambe Bay NHS Foundation Trust in the United Kingdom conclude the following about the 14-3-3n biomarker:

1. adequate evidence for helping to assess the veracity of the diagnosis and severity of early rheumatoid arthritis (RA);
2. can be combined with existing markers for severity and to provide possible ways of stratifying patients into more effective treatment groups; and
3. a welcome new addition for rheumatologist’s diagnostic, treatment and strategy in RA.

== Role of extracellular 14-3-3η ==
Exogenous 14-3-3η stimulation has been reported to stimulate various cell types including macrophages, monocytes, and fibroblast-like synoviocytes activating key cell signalling cascades including:

1. JAK-STAT signaling pathway
2. PI3K/AKT/mTOR pathway
3. MAPK/ERK pathway
4. JNK/AP-1 pathway
5. FOXO3-SNAI1

Stimulation of cells by extracellular 14-3-3η has been reported to increase key factors relevant to the pathophysiology of rheumatoid arthritis, including:

1. Tumor necrosis factor alpha
2. Interleukin 6
3. CCL2/MCP-1
4. Matrix metalloproteinase (MMPs)
5. RANKL

Exogenous stimulation of human fibroblast-like synoviocytes, in a dose dependent manner, resulted in the development of invadosomes. Silencing of 14-3-3n via shRNA resulted in decreased invadosome formation. Invadosomes are finger-like projections that bud from the cell membrane and are directly associated with increasing the migratory or invasive potential of cells. In RA, this might account for how the disease travels to neighboring joints.

Taken together, extracellular 14-3-3η upregulates pro-inflammatory factors directly that are targeted with small molecules and/or biological Disease-modifying antirheumatic drug (DMARDs), including TNF, IL-6 and Janus kinases. The table below defines the medicines by target.

Target	Inhibitor
Tumor Necrosis Factor	Adalimumab Golimumab Etanercept Certolizumab Inflixamab Inflectra
Interleukin 6	Tocilizumab Sarilumab
Janus Kinase	Tofacitnib Upadacitinib Baricitinib Ruxolitinib Fedratinib

== Key Clinical Findings ==
The body of independent evidence supporting the clinical utility of 14-3-3η continues to expand. As of 2022, there have been over 50 peer-reviewed citations and 200 conference proceedings describing the clinical value of the 14-3-3η biomarker.

Diagnostic Value of 14-3-3η Marker. As shown in the table above, a number of studies have evaluated the specificity, sensitivity and value of 14-3-3η in combination with rheumatoid factor (RF) and/or the anti-cyclic citrullinated protein (ACPA, anti-CCP). According to Abdelhafiz et al. meta-analysis of all studies reported a pooled sensitivity of 73% (95% CI: 71 - 75) and a pooled specificity of 88% (95% CI: 87 - 90). In an Early Undifferentiated Polyarthritis (EUPA) cohort from the University of Sherbrooke where 14-3-3n were assessed in 331 subjects, the diagnostic accuracy of RF, CCP and RF and/or CCP was increased by: 24.0%, 36.8% and 15.0% respectively.

Prognostic Value of the 14-3-3η Marker. An analysis of 331 patients from the EUPA cohort with five (5) years of longitudinal follow-up demonstrated that baseline 14-3-3η positivity, at the diagnostic cut-off of > 0.19 ng/ml, was associated with more radiographic progression over the five (5) years. Sustained and/or elevated 14-3-3η positivity over the course of the five (5) years of follow-up was associated with a higher likelihood of radiographic progression. Serial decreases in 14-3-3η of 0.76 ng/ml or reversion to a negative test during follow-up was associated with less subsequent radiographic progression.

Serial Changes in 14-3-3η Marker with Effective Disease Management. 14-3-3η has been described as a modifiable marker, with post-treatment levels having been reported to decrease, stay the same, or in some cases increase despite patients being treated with different classes of therapy including small molecule and biological DMARDs like Methotrexate, Adalimumab, Tocilizumab, Tofacitinib and Upadacitinib. Post-treatment decreases and/or reversion to a negative 14-3-3η test is typically associated with better patient outcomes, whereas sustained positivity and/or increases in the 14-3-3η marker longitudinally is often associated with worse outcomes.

Further research is required to determine if certain therapies have a greater impact on the modifiability of 14-3-3η. Current data points towards more of a proximal or interactive effect between 14-3-3η and TNF alpha.

Targeting Drug Free Remission. With the advent of more effective RA treatments and more aggressive patient management strategies, drug free remission is now a possibility however, an important consideration when weaning a patient off of a DMARD is the concomitant risk of flaring. In a cohort of 331 patients from the EUPA cohort, Carrier et al. demonstrated that 14-3-3η positivity at the time of remission was associated with increased likelihood of radiographic progression. Whilst further research is required to investigate how 14-3-3η informs risk of flaring and radiographic progression in patients that have achieved remission, the current data indicates that patients in clinical remission with a positive 14-3-3η test should be considered as higher risk for disease progression.

Detection of 14-3-3η Pre-Disease or in Other Arthritides. As earlier detection of RA is often associated with better clinical outcomes, evaluating how 14-3-3η informs risk of disease onset in asymptomatic patients is and will continue to be of paramount importance to investigate. In a study by Hitchon et al, the authors demonstrated that 14-3-3η levels were detectable in 1st degree relatives of patients diagnosed with RA, and that levels of 14-3-3η increased in 1st degree relatives at the time of transition to RA. The authors suggested that 14-3-3η was an imminent marker of RA transition. Additional studies in a larger subset of patients is required to fully evaluate when, why and how 14-3-3η levels increase in at-risk patients.

14-3-3η has also been demonstrated to be detectable in lupus patients diagnosed with secondary Sjogren’s, albeit at lower levels than RA patients.
