= KLC3 =

Protein-coding gene in the species Homo sapiens

Identifiers
- Aliases: KLC3, KLC2, KLC2L, KLCt, KNS2B, kinesin light chain 3
- External IDs: OMIM: 601334; MGI: 1277971; GeneCards: KLC3

Gene location (Human)
Chr.	Chromosome 19 (human)
Band	19q13.32	Start	45,333,434 bp
Band	19q13.32	End	45,351,520 bp

Gene location (Mouse)
Chr.	Chromosome 7 (mouse)
Band	7 A3|7 9.62 cM	Start	19,128,362 bp
Band	7 A3|7 9.62 cM	End	19,138,029 bp
RNA expression pattern
Bgee	Human / Mouse (ortholog); Top expressed in: skin of arm; skin of abdomen; skin of leg; amniotic fluid; gingival epithelium; superficial temporal artery; skin of thigh; nasal epithelium; vulva; external globus pallidus / Top expressed in: lip; vestibular membrane of cochlear duct; neural layer of retina; esophagus; skin of external ear; hair follicle; skin of back; skin of abdomen; olfactory epithelium; seminiferous tubule; More reference expression data
BioGPS	n/a
Gene ontology
Molecular function	microtubule binding; microtubule motor activity; protein binding; kinesin binding
Cellular component	cytoplasm; neuron projection; motile cilium; microtubule; cytoskeleton; kinesin complex; ciliary rootlet
Biological process	axo-dendritic transport
Sources:Amigo / QuickGO
Orthologs
Databases	NCBI: entry; OMA: entry
Species	Human	Mouse
Entrez	147700	232943
Ensembl	ENSG00000104892	ENSMUSG00000040714
UniProt	Q6P597	Q91W40
RefSeq (mRNA)	NM_145275; NM_177417	NM_001286038; NM_001286039; NM_146182
RefSeq (protein)	NP_803136	NP_001272967; NP_001272968; NP_666294; NP_001390614
Location (UCSC)	Chr 19: 45.33 – 45.35 Mb	Chr 7: 19.13 – 19.14 Mb
PubMed search
- Wikidata
View/Edit Human	View/Edit Mouse

Kinesin light chain 3 is a protein that in humans is encoded by the KLC3 gene.

== Function ==
This gene encodes a member of the kinesin light chain gene family. Kinesins are molecular motors involved in the transport of cargo along microtubules, and are composed of two kinesin heavy chain (KHC) and two kinesin light chain (KLC) molecules. KLCs are thought to typically be involved in binding cargo and regulating kinesin activity. In the rat, a protein similar to this gene product is expressed in post-meiotic spermatids, where it associates with structural components of sperm tails and mitochondria.

== Interactions ==
KLC3 has been shown to interact with YWHAH.
