= PPFIA4 =

Protein-coding gene in humans

Identifiers
- Aliases: PPFIA4, PTPRF interacting protein alpha 4
- External IDs: OMIM: 603145; GeneCards: PPFIA4

Gene location (Human)
Chr.	Chromosome 1 (human)
Band	1q32.1	Start	203,026,491 bp
Band	1q32.1	End	203,078,740 bp
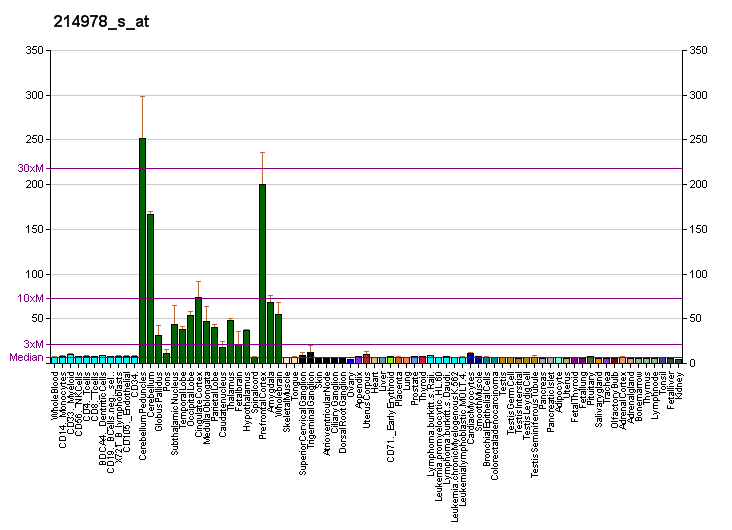
RNA expression pattern
Bgee	Human / Mouse (ortholog); Top expressed in: cerebellar hemisphere; right hemisphere of cerebellum; cerebellar vermis; paraflocculus of cerebellum; right frontal lobe; primary visual cortex; Brodmann area 9; middle temporal gyrus; apex of heart; cingulate gyrus / n/a; More reference expression data
BioGPS	More reference expression data
Gene ontology
Molecular function	protein binding
Cellular component	cytoplasm; presynaptic active zone; cell surface; cytosol; synapse; intracellular anatomical structure
Biological process	glutamate secretion; neurotransmitter secretion
Sources:Amigo / QuickGO
Orthologs
Databases	NCBI: entry; OMA: entry
Species	Human	Mouse
Entrez	8497	n/a
Ensembl	ENSG00000143847	n/a
UniProt	O75335	n/a
RefSeq (mRNA)	NM_001304331; NM_001304332; NM_015053; NM_001393950; NM_001393951 NM_001393952; NM_001393953; NM_001393954; NM_001393955; NM_001393956; NM_001393957	n/a
RefSeq (protein)	NP_001291260; NP_001291261	n/a
Location (UCSC)	Chr 1: 203.03 – 203.08 Mb	n/a
PubMed search		n/a
- Wikidata
View/Edit Human

Liprin-alpha-4 is a protein that in humans is encoded by the PPFIA4 gene.

== Interactions ==
PPFIA4 has been shown to interact with:

- ERC2,
- GIT1, and
- Nuclear receptor coactivator 2.
