= Active zone =

Synapse-related term in neuroscience

- A diagram of a typical central nervous system synapse. The proteins of the active zone are represented as dark brown pyramids on the upper neuron terminal

Details

Identifiers
- Latin: zona activa
- TH: H2.00.06.2.00012

The active zone or synaptic active zone is a term first used by Couteaux and Pecot-Dechavassinein in 1970 to define the site of neurotransmitter release. Two neurons make near contact through structures called synapses allowing them to communicate with each other. As shown in the adjacent diagram, a synapse consists of the presynaptic bouton of one neuron which stores vesicles containing neurotransmitter (uppermost in the picture), and a second, postsynaptic neuron which bears receptors for the neurotransmitter (at the bottom), together with a gap between the two called the synaptic cleft (with synaptic adhesion molecules, SAMs, holding the two together). When an action potential reaches the presynaptic bouton, the contents of the vesicles are released into the synaptic cleft and the released neurotransmitter travels across the cleft to the postsynaptic neuron (the lower structure in the picture) and activates the receptors on the postsynaptic membrane.

The active zone is the region in the presynaptic bouton that mediates neurotransmitter release and is composed of the presynaptic membrane and a dense collection of proteins called the cytomatrix at the active zone (CAZ). The CAZ is seen under the electron microscope to be a dark (electron dense) area close to the membrane. Proteins within the CAZ tether synaptic vesicles to the presynaptic membrane and mediate synaptic vesicle fusion, thereby allowing neurotransmitter to be released reliably and rapidly when an action potential arrives.

== Function ==
The function of the active zone is to ensure that neurotransmitters can be reliably released in a specific location of a neuron and only released when the neuron fires an action potential. As an action potential propagates down an axon it reaches the axon terminal called the presynaptic bouton. In the presynaptic bouton, the action potential activates calcium channels (VDCCs) that cause a local influx of calcium. The increase in calcium is detected by proteins in the active zone and forces vesicles containing neurotransmitter to fuse with the membrane. This fusion of the vesicles with the membrane releases the neurotransmitters into the synaptic cleft (space between the presynaptic bouton and the postsynaptic membrane). The neurotransmitters then diffuse across the cleft and bind to ligand gated ion channels and G-protein coupled receptors on the postsynaptic membrane. The binding of neurotransmitters to the postsynaptic receptors then induces a change in the postsynaptic neuron. The process of releasing neurotransmitters and binding to the postsynaptic receptors to cause a change in the postsynaptic neuron is called neurotransmission.

== Structure ==
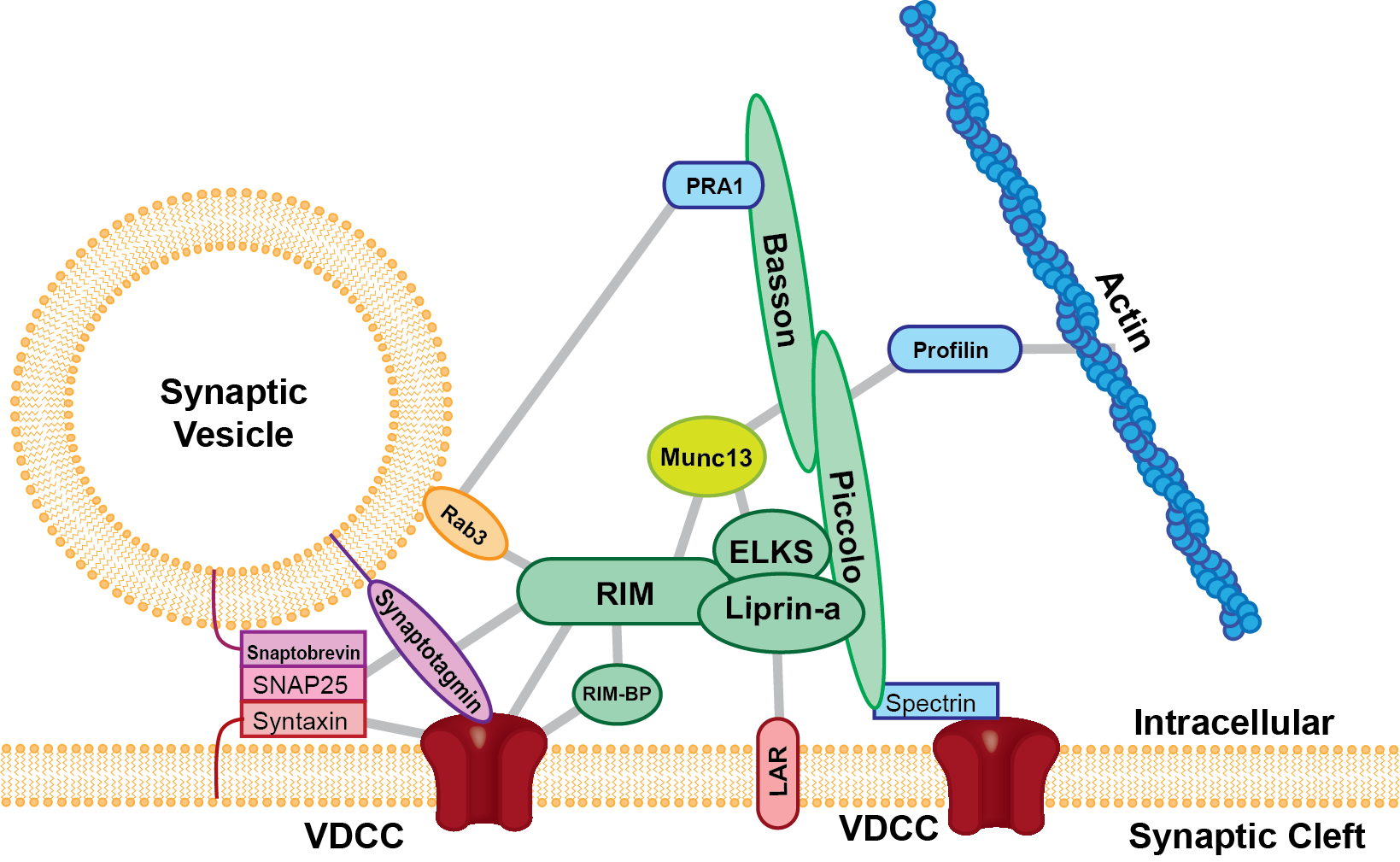
A diagram of the proteins found in the active zone

The active zone is present in all chemical synapses examined so far and is present in all animal species. The active zones examined so far have at least two features in common, they all have protein dense material that project from the membrane and tethers synaptic vesicles close to the membrane and they have long filamentous projections originating at the membrane and terminating at vesicles slightly farther from the presynaptic membrane. The protein dense projections vary in size and shape depending on the type of synapse examined. One striking example of the dense projection is the ribbon synapse (see below) which contains a "ribbon" of protein dense material that is surrounded by a halo of synaptic vesicles and extends perpendicular to the presynaptic membrane and can be as long as 500 nm. The glutamate synapse contains smaller pyramid like structures that extend about 50 nm from the membrane. The neuromuscular synapse contains two rows of vesicles with a long proteinaceous band between them that is connected to regularly spaced horizontal ribs extending perpendicular to the band and parallel with the membrane. These ribs are then connected to the vesicles which are each positioned above a peg in the membrane (presumably a calcium channel). Previous research indicated that the active zone of glutamatergic neurons contained a highly regular array of pyramid shaped protein dense material and indicated that these pyramids were connected by filaments. This structure resembled a geometric lattice where vesicles were guided into holes of the lattice. This attractive model has come into question by recent experiments. Recent data shows that the glutamatergic active zone does contain the dense protein material projections but these projections were not in a regular array and contained long filaments projecting about 80 nm into the cytoplasm.

There are at least five major scaffold proteins that are enriched in the active zone; UNC13B/Munc13, RIMS1 (Rab3-interacting molecule), Bassoon, Piccolo/aczonin, ELKS, and liprins-α. These scaffold proteins are thought to be the constituents of the dense pyramid like structures of the active zone and are thought to bring the synaptic vesicles into close proximity to the presynaptic membrane and the calcium channels. The protein ELKS binds to the cell adhesion protein, β-neurexin, and other proteins within the complex such as Piccolo and Bassoon. β-neurexin then binds to cell adhesion molecule, neuroligin located on the postsynaptic membrane. Neuroligin then interacts with proteins that bind to postsynaptic receptors. Protein interactions like that seen between Piccolo/ELKS/β-neurexin/neuroligin ensures that machinery that mediates vesicle fusion is in close proximity to calcium channels and that vesicle fusion is adjacent to postsynaptic receptors. This close proximity vesicle fusion and postsynaptic receptors ensures that there is little delay between the activation of the postsynaptic receptors and the release of neurotransmitters.

== Neurotransmitter release mechanism ==
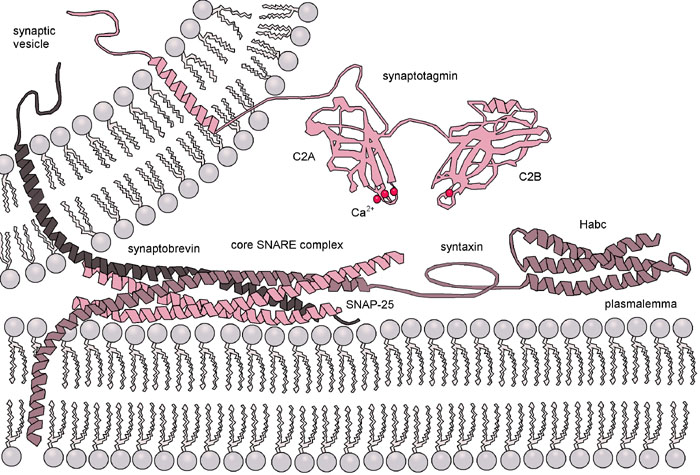
The vesicle release machinery.

The release of neurotransmitter is accomplished by the fusion of neurotransmitter vesicles to the presynaptic membrane. Although the details of this mechanism are still being studied there is a consensus on some details of the process. Synaptic vesicle fusion with the presynaptic membrane is known to require a local increase of calcium from as few as a single, closely associated calcium channels and the formation of highly stable SNARE complexes. One prevailing model of synaptic vesicle fusion is that SNARE complex formation is catalyzed by the proteins of the active zone such as Munc18, Munc13, and RIM. The formation of this complex is thought to "prime" the vesicle to be ready for vesicle fusion and release of neurotransmitter (see below: releasable pool). After the vesicle is primed then complexin binds to the SNARE complex this is called "superprimed". The vesicles that are superprimed are within the readily releasable pool (see below) and are ready to be rapidly released. The arrival of an action potential opens voltage gated calcium channels near the SNARE/complexin complex. Calcium then binds to change the conformation of synaptotagmin. This change in conformation of allows synaptotagmin to then dislodge complexin, bind to the SNARE complex, and bind to the target membrane. When synaptotagmin binds to both the SNARE complex and the membrane this induces a mechanical force on the membrane so that it causes the vesicle membrane and presynaptic membrane to fuse. This fusion opens a membrane pore that releases the neurotransmitter. The pore increases in size until the entire vesicle membrane is indistinguishable from the presynaptic membrane.

== Synaptic vesicle cycle ==
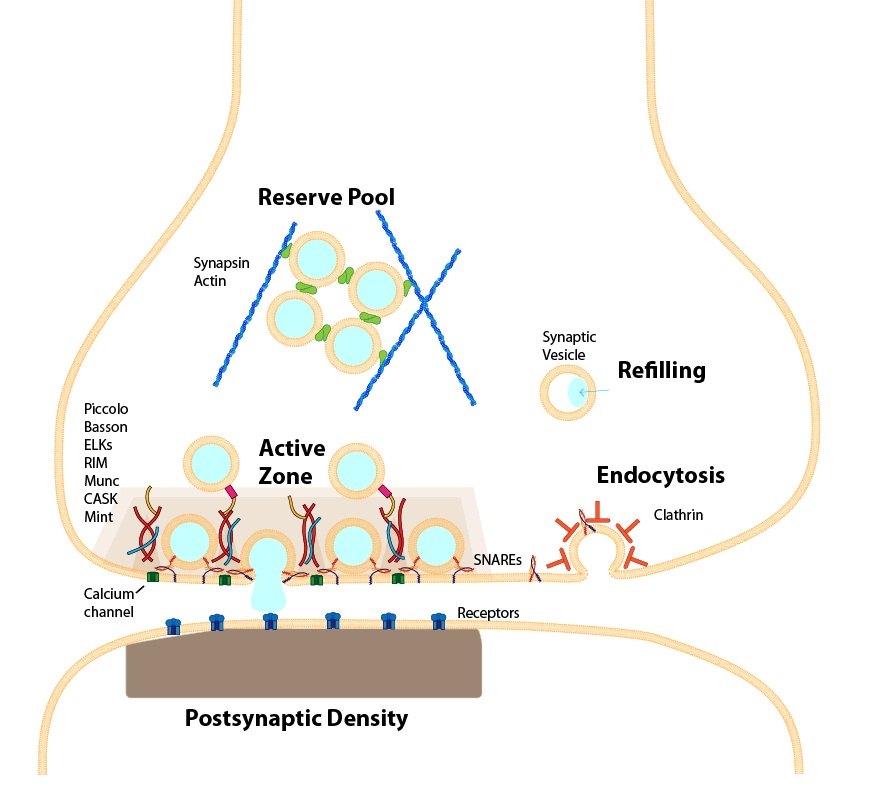
The presynaptic active zone and the synaptic vesicle cycle

The presynaptic bouton has an efficiently orchestrated process to fuse vesicles to the presynaptic membrane to release neurotransmitters and regenerate neurotransmitter vesicles. This process called the synaptic vesicle cycle maintains the number of vesicles in the presynaptic bouton and allows the synaptic terminal to be an autonomous unit. The cycle begins with (1) a region of the golgi apparatus is pinched off to form the synaptic vesicle and this vesicle is transported to the synaptic terminal. At the terminal (2) the vesicle is filled with neurotransmitter. (3) The vesicle is transported to the active zone and docked in close proximity to the plasma membrane. (4) During an action potential the vesicle is fused with the membrane, releases the neurotransmitter and allows the membrane proteins previously on the vesicle to diffuse to the periactive zone. (5) In the periactive zone the membrane proteins are sequestered and are endocytosed forming a clathrin coated vesicle. (6) The vesicle is then filled with neurotransmitter and is then transported back to the active zone.

The endocytosis mechanism is slower than the exocytosis mechanism. This means that in intense activity the vesicle in the terminal can become depleted and no longer available to be released. To help prevent the depletion of synaptic vesicles the increase in calcium during intense activity can activate calcineurin which dephosphorylate proteins involved in clathrin-mediated endocytosis.

== Vesicle pools ==
The synapse contains at least two clusters of synaptic vesicles, the readily releasable pool and the reserve pool. The readily releasable pool is located within the active zone and connected directly to the presynaptic membrane while the reserve pool is clustered by cytoskeletal and is not directly connected to the active zone.

=== Releasable pool ===
The releasable pool is located in the active zone and is bound directly to the presynaptic membrane. It is stabilized by proteins within the active zone and bound to the presynaptic membrane by SNARE proteins. These vesicles are ready to release by a single action potential and are replenished by vesicles from the reserve pool. The releasable pool is sometimes subdivided into the readily releasable pool and the releasable pool.

=== Reserve pool ===
The reserve pool is not directly connected to the active zone. The increase in presynaptic calcium concentration activates calcium–calmodulin-dependent protein kinase (CaMK). CaMK phosphorylates a protein, synapsin, that mediates the clustering of the reserve pool vesicles and attachment to the cytoskeleton. Phosphorylation of synapsin mobilizes vesicles in the reserve pool and allows them to migrate to the active zone and replenish the readily releasable pool.

== Periactive zone ==
The periactive zone surrounds the active zone and is the site of endocytosis of the presynaptic terminal. In the periactive zone, scaffolding proteins such as intersectin 1 recruit proteins that mediate endocytosis such as dynamin, clathrin and endophilin. In Drosophila the intersectin homolog, Dap160, is located in the periactive zone of the neuromuscular junction and mutant Dap160 deplete synaptic vesicles during high frequency stimulation.

== Ribbon synapse active zone ==
The ribbon synapse is a special type of synapse found in sensory neurons such as photoreceptor cells, retinal bipolar cells, and hair cells. Ribbon synapses contain a dense protein structure that tethers an array of vesicles perpendicular to the presynaptic membrane. In an electron micrograph it appears as a ribbon like structure perpendicular to the membrane. Unlike the 'traditional' synapse, ribbon synapses can maintain a graded release of vesicles. In other words, the more depolarized a neuron the higher the rate of vesicle fusion. The Ribbon synapse active zone is separated into two regions, the archiform density and the ribbon. The archiform density is the site of vesicle fusion and the ribbon stores the releasable pool of vesicles. The ribbon structure is composed primarily of the protein RIBEYE, about 64–69% of the ribbon volume, and is tethered to the archiform density by scaffolding proteins such as Bassoon.

== Proteins ==
Protein	Structure/Function
Structural Proteins	
Piccolo	
Bassoon	
RIMs	
ELKS (ERCs or CAST)	
CASK	
Mint	
Liprin-alpha-1	
Docking and Priming	
Munc-13	
Munc-18	
SNAREs	
SNAP25	
VAMP2	
syntaxin	Located on the synaptic membrane and binds to SNAP-25 and synaptobrevin to mediate vesicle fusion.
Cytoskeletal Proteins	
Actin	
Tubulin	
myosin Multiple myosin II molecules generate force in skeletal muscle through a power stroke mechanism fuelled by the energy released from ATP hydrolysis	
spectrin	
β-catenin	
Calcium Channel	
Voltage-dependent calcium channel (VDCC)	Allows the rapid influx of calcium during an action potential.

== Measuring neurotransmitter release ==
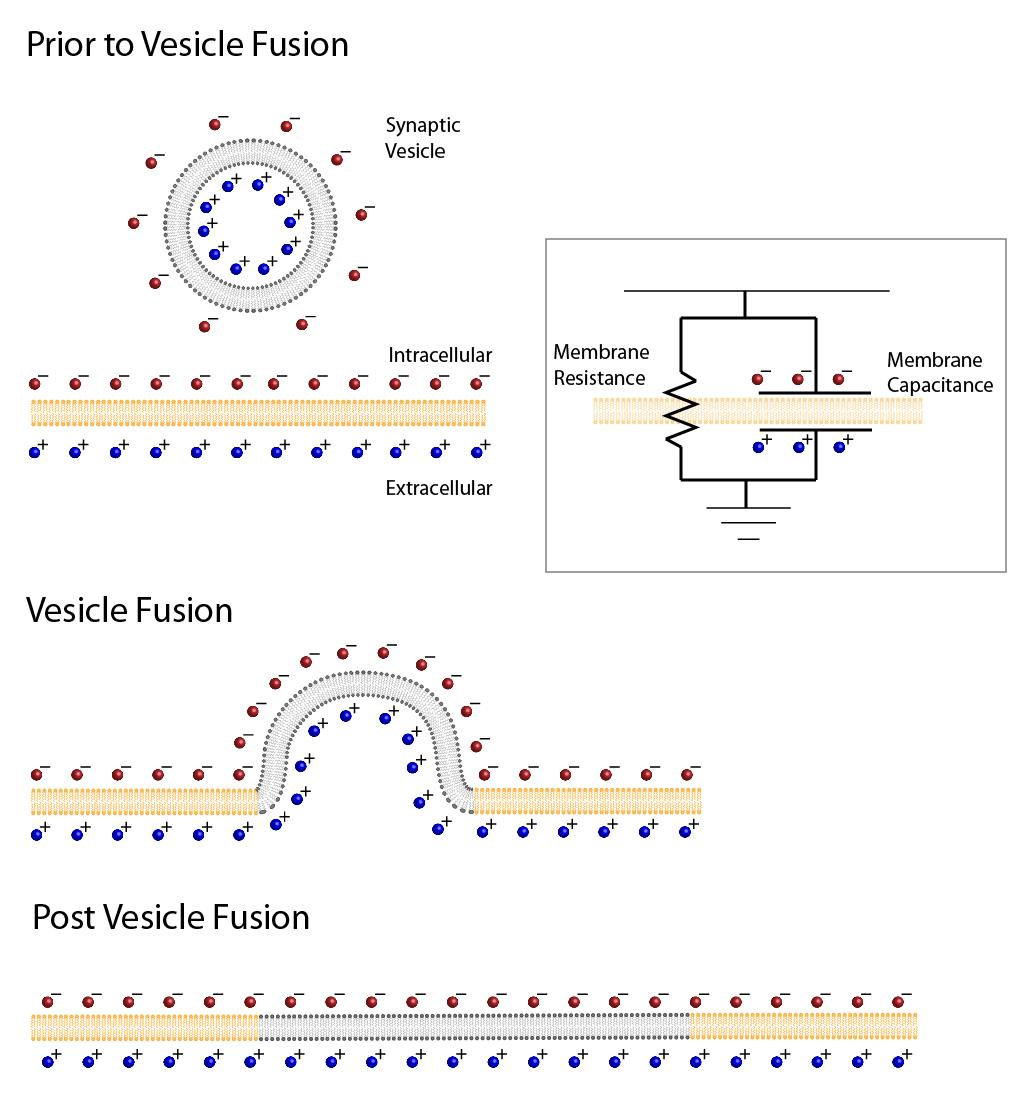
A diagram showing the change in membrane capacitance before (top) and after (middle and bottom) vesicle fusion.

Neurotransmitter release can be measured by determining the amplitude of the postsynaptic potential after triggering an action potential in the presynaptic neuron. Measuring neurotransmitter release this way can be problematic because the effect of the postsynaptic neuron to the same amount of released neurotransmitter can change over time. Another way is to measure vesicle fusion with the presynaptic membrane directly using a patch pipette. A cell membrane can be thought of as a capacitor in that positive and negative ions are stored on both sides of the membrane. The larger the area of membrane the more ions that are necessary to hold the membrane at a certain potential. In electrophysiology this means that a current injection into the terminal will take less time to charge a membrane to a given potential before vesicle fusion than it will after vesicle fusion. The time course to charge the membrane to a potential and the resistance of the membrane is measured and with these values the capacitance of the membrane can be calculated by the equation Tau/Resistance=Capacitance. With this technique researchers can measure synaptic vesicle release directly by measuring increases in the membrane capacitance of the presynaptic terminal.

== See also ==
- Paired pulse facilitation
- Postsynaptic density
