= PTPRS =

Protein-coding gene in the species Homo sapiens

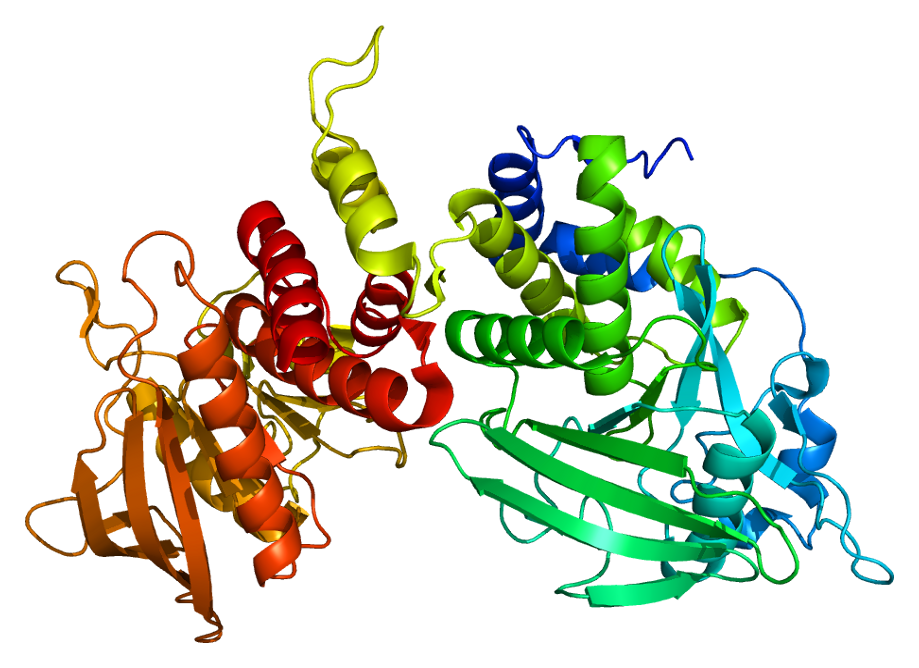

Identifiers
- Aliases: PTPRS, PTPSIGMA, protein tyrosine phosphatase, receptor type S, R-PTP-S, R-PTP-sigma, protein tyrosine phosphatase receptor type S
- External IDs: OMIM: 601576; MGI: 97815; GeneCards: PTPRS
Available structures
PDB	Ortholog search: PDBe RCSB
PDB	List of PDB id codes 2FH7, 2YD2, 2YD3, 2YD9, 4BPC, 4PBX
Enzyme activity
EC #	BRENDA	ExPASy	KEGG	MetaCyc
3.1.3.48	↗	↗	↗	↗

Gene location (Human)
Chr.	Chromosome 19 (human)
Band	19p13.3	Start	5,158,495 bp
Band	19p13.3	End	5,340,812 bp

Gene location (Mouse)
Chr.	Chromosome 17 (mouse)
Band	17 D|17 29.32 cM	Start	56,719,426 bp
Band	17 D|17 29.32 cM	End	56,783,483 bp
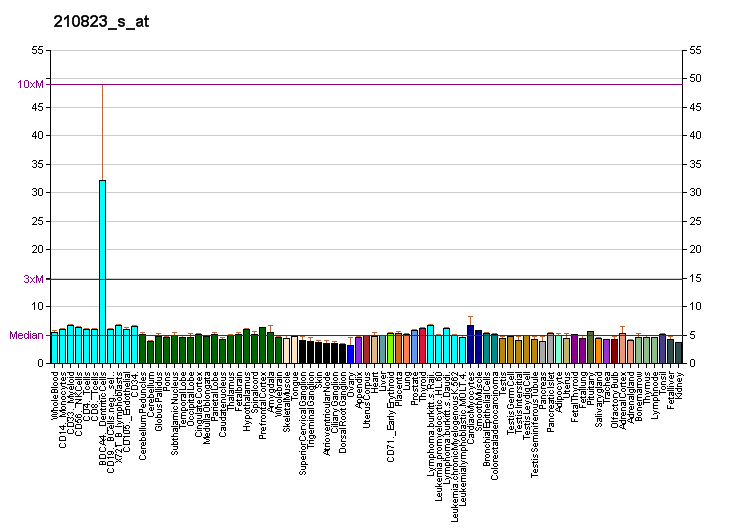
RNA expression pattern
Bgee	Human / Mouse (ortholog); Top expressed in: ganglionic eminence; sural nerve; ventricular zone; gastric mucosa; stromal cell of endometrium; left uterine tube; right hemisphere of cerebellum; right ovary; right lung; right coronary artery / Top expressed in: dentate gyrus of hippocampal formation granule cell; ganglionic eminence; ventricular zone; renal corpuscle; superior frontal gyrus; Rostral migratory stream; primary visual cortex; genital tubercle; subiculum; CA3 field; More reference expression data
BioGPS	More reference expression data
Gene ontology
Molecular function	phosphatase activity; protein binding; hydrolase activity; phosphoprotein phosphatase activity; protein tyrosine phosphatase activity; heparin binding; chondroitin sulfate binding; heparan sulfate proteoglycan binding
Cellular component	integral component of membrane; integral component of plasma membrane; extracellular exosome; membrane; plasma membrane; integral component of synaptic vesicle membrane; integral component of postsynaptic density membrane; postsynaptic density; cell junction; axon; synaptic vesicle membrane; cytoplasmic vesicle; cell projection; neuron projection; perikaryon; synapse; postsynaptic membrane; Schaffer collateral - CA1 synapse; glutamatergic synapse; integral component of presynaptic membrane
Biological process	cell adhesion; dephosphorylation; protein dephosphorylation; negative regulation of interferon-alpha production; negative regulation of interferon-beta production; negative regulation of toll-like receptor 9 signaling pathway; negative regulation of neuron projection development; spinal cord development; cerebellum development; hippocampus development; cerebral cortex development; corpus callosum development; negative regulation of axon extension; peptidyl-tyrosine dephosphorylation; negative regulation of collateral sprouting; negative regulation of axon regeneration; negative regulation of dendritic spine development; establishment of endothelial intestinal barrier; modulation of chemical synaptic transmission; synapse organization; regulation of postsynaptic density assembly; synaptic membrane adhesion
Sources:Amigo / QuickGO
Orthologs
Databases	NCBI: entry; OMA: entry
Species	Human	Mouse
Entrez	5802	19280
Ensembl	ENSG00000105426	ENSMUSG00000013236
UniProt	Q13332	B0V2N1
RefSeq (mRNA)	NM_002850; NM_130853; NM_130854; NM_130855; NM_001394011 NM_001394012; NM_001394013	NM_001252453; NM_001252455; NM_001252456; NM_011218
RefSeq (protein)	NP_002841; NP_570923; NP_570924; NP_570925	NP_001239382; NP_001239384; NP_001239385; NP_035348
Location (UCSC)	Chr 19: 5.16 – 5.34 Mb	Chr 17: 56.72 – 56.78 Mb
PubMed search
- Wikidata
View/Edit Human	View/Edit Mouse

Receptor-type tyrosine-protein phosphatase S, also known as R-PTP-S, R-PTP-sigma, or PTPσ, is an enzyme that in humans is encoded by the PTPRS gene.

== Function ==
The protein encoded by this gene is a member of the protein tyrosine phosphatase (PTP) family. PTPs are known to be signaling molecules that regulate a variety of cellular processes including cell growth, differentiation, mitotic cycle, and oncogenic transformation. This PTP contains an extracellular region, a single transmembrane segment and two tandem intracytoplasmic catalytic domains (D1 and D2), and thus represents a receptor-type PTP. D1 is catalytically active, while D2 is catalytically inactive. The extracellular region of this protein is composed of multiple Ig-like and fibronectin type III-like domains. Rem2 signaling affects neuronal structure and function in part by regulation of gene expression. Molecular and Cellular NeuroscienceStudies of the similar gene in mice suggested that this PTP may be involved in cell-cell interaction, primary axonogenesis, and axon guidance during embryogenesis. This PTP has been also implicated in the molecular control of adult nerve repair. Four alternatively spliced transcript variants, which encode distinct proteins, have been reported.

== Clinical significance ==
A PTPRS protein mimetic may improve muscular and bladder control in rats with spinal cord injuries.

== Interactions ==
PTPRS has been shown to interact with:

- chondroitin sulphate proteoglycans,
- PTPRD, glial-derived and
- liprin-alpha-1.
- NME2.
