= ERC2 (gene) =

Protein-coding gene in the species Homo sapiens

Identifiers
- Aliases: ERC2, CAST, CAST1, ELKSL, SPBC110, Spc110, ELKS/RAB6-interacting/CAST family member 2
- External IDs: OMIM: 617250; MGI: 1098749; GeneCards: ERC2

Gene location (Human)
Chr.	Chromosome 3 (human)
Band	3p14.3	Start	55,508,311 bp
Band	3p14.3	End	56,468,467 bp

Gene location (Mouse)
Chr.	Chromosome 14 (mouse)
Band	14 A3|14 16.51 cM	Start	27,344,385 bp
Band	14 A3|14 16.51 cM	End	28,200,494 bp
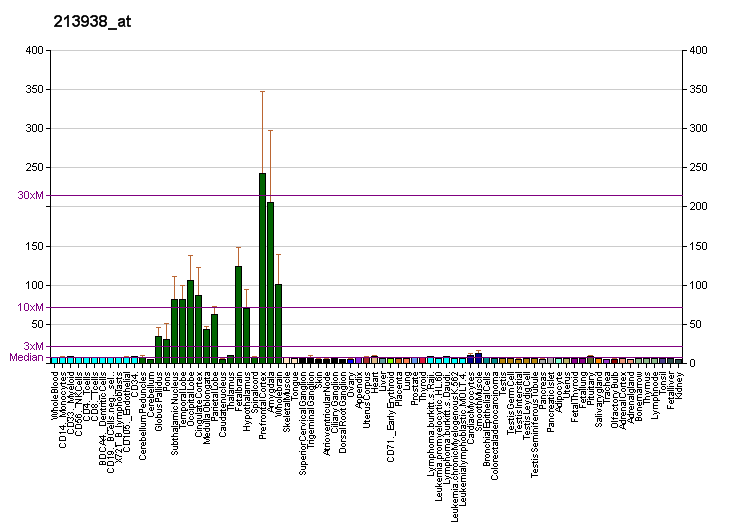
RNA expression pattern
Bgee	Human / Mouse (ortholog); Top expressed in: middle temporal gyrus; Brodmann area 23; orbitofrontal cortex; endothelial cell; Brodmann area 46; superior frontal gyrus; pars compacta; entorhinal cortex; postcentral gyrus; frontal pole / Top expressed in: piriform cortex; dentate gyrus; trigeminal ganglion; dentate gyrus of hippocampal formation granule cell; nucleus accumbens; olfactory tubercle; temporal lobe; amygdala; subdivision of hippocampus; dorsal striatum; More reference expression data
BioGPS	More reference expression data
Gene ontology
Molecular function	protein binding; structural constituent of presynaptic active zone
Cellular component	cytoplasm; growth cone; presynaptic active zone; neuron projection; cell junction; synapse; cytoskeleton; presynaptic membrane; presynaptic active zone cytoplasmic component; glutamatergic synapse; GABA-ergic synapse
Biological process	synaptic vesicle priming; maintenance of presynaptic active zone structure
Sources:Amigo / QuickGO
Orthologs
Databases	NCBI: entry; OMA: entry
Species	Human	Mouse
Entrez	26059	238988
Ensembl	ENSG00000187672	ENSMUSG00000040640
UniProt	O15083	Q6PH08
RefSeq (mRNA)	NM_015576	NM_177814; NM_001347497
RefSeq (protein)	NP_056391	NP_001334426; NP_808482; NP_001391863; NP_001391864; NP_001391865 NP_001391866
Location (UCSC)	Chr 3: 55.51 – 56.47 Mb	Chr 14: 27.34 – 28.2 Mb
PubMed search
- Wikidata
View/Edit Human	View/Edit Mouse

ERC protein 2 is a protein that in humans is encoded by the ERC2 gene.

== Interactions ==
ERC2 (gene) has been shown to interact with PPFIA4, RIMS1, UNC13A, and liprin-alpha-1.
