= PCLO =

Protein-coding gene in humans

Identifiers
- Aliases: PCLO, ACZ, PCH3, piccolo presynaptic cytomatrix protein
- External IDs: OMIM: 604918; MGI: 1349390; GeneCards: PCLO
Available structures
PDB	Ortholog search: PDBe RCSB
PDB	List of PDB id codes 1UJD

Gene location (Human)
Chr.	Chromosome 7 (human)
Band	7q21.11	Start	82,754,012 bp
Band	7q21.11	End	83,162,930 bp

Gene location (Mouse)
Chr.	Chromosome 5 (mouse)
Band	5|5 A1- A2	Start	14,564,932 bp
Band	5|5 A1- A2	End	14,913,473 bp
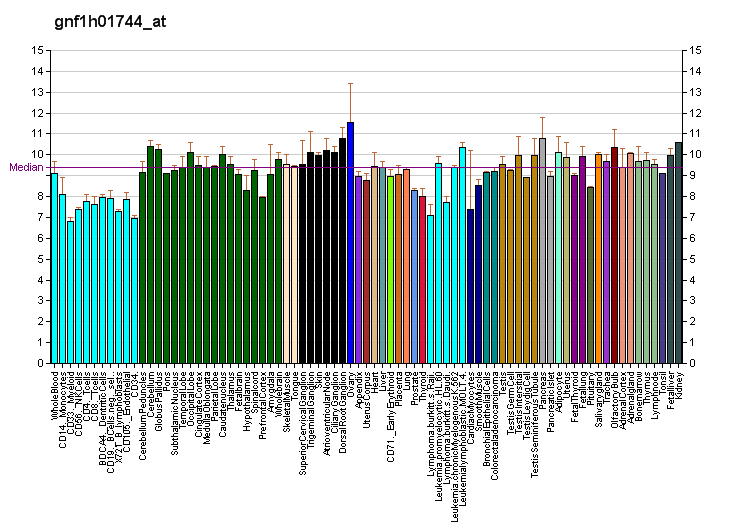

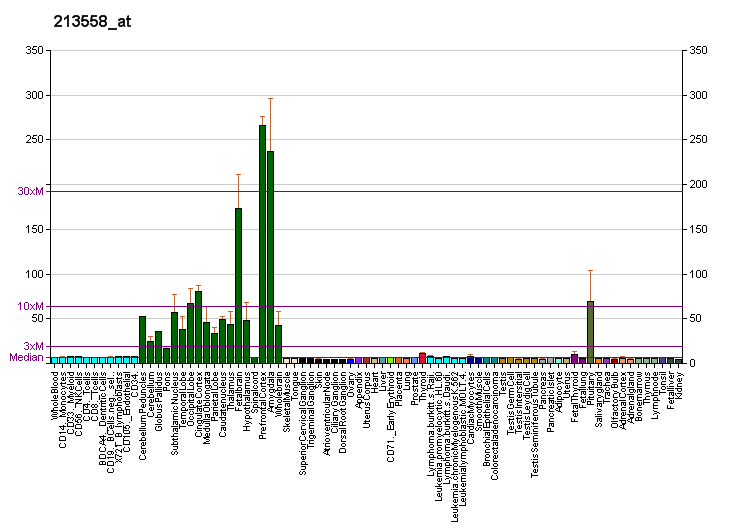

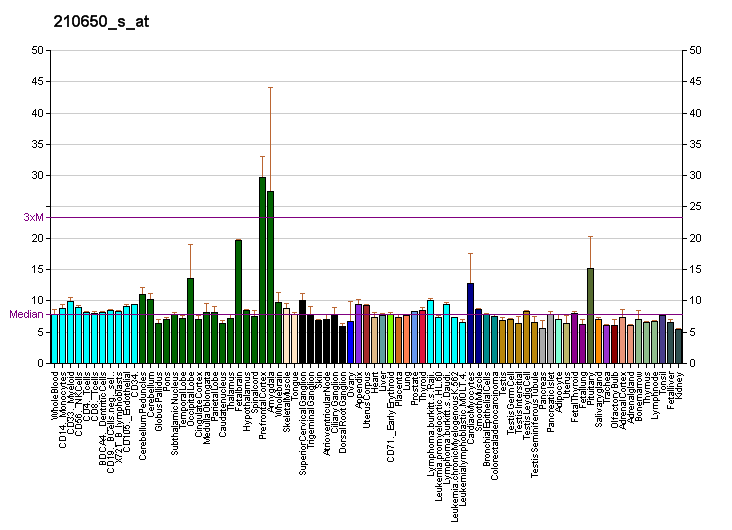
RNA expression pattern
Bgee	Human / Mouse (ortholog); Top expressed in: Brodmann area 23; middle temporal gyrus; cerebellar vermis; orbitofrontal cortex; Region I of hippocampus proper; endothelial cell; frontal pole; entorhinal cortex; Brodmann area 46; superior frontal gyrus / Top expressed in: cingulate gyrus; primary motor cortex; prefrontal cortex; subiculum; medial dorsal nucleus; temporal lobe; amygdala; superior cervical ganglion; olfactory tubercle; piriform cortex; More reference expression data
BioGPS	More reference expression data
Gene ontology
Molecular function	calcium-dependent phospholipid binding; profilin binding; calcium ion binding; metal ion binding; structural constituent of presynaptic active zone
Cellular component	presynaptic active zone; cell junction; synapse; cytoskeleton; extracellular exosome; membrane; postsynaptic density; cytoskeleton of presynaptic active zone; presynaptic active zone cytoplasmic component
Biological process	regulation of exocytosis; synapse assembly; insulin secretion; cytoskeleton organization; cAMP-mediated signaling; synaptic vesicle exocytosis; protein localization to synapse; presynapse to nucleus signaling pathway; maintenance of presynaptic active zone structure; synaptic vesicle clustering
Sources:Amigo / QuickGO
Orthologs
Databases	NCBI: entry; OMA: entry
Species	Human	Mouse
Entrez	27445	26875
Ensembl	ENSG00000186472	ENSMUSG00000061601
UniProt	Q9Y6V0	Q9QYX7
RefSeq (mRNA)	NM_033026; NM_014510	NM_001110796; NM_011995
RefSeq (protein)	NP_055325; NP_149015	NP_001104266; NP_036125
Location (UCSC)	Chr 7: 82.75 – 83.16 Mb	Chr 5: 14.56 – 14.91 Mb
PubMed search
- Wikidata
View/Edit Human	View/Edit Mouse

Protein piccolo is a protein that in humans is encoded by the PCLO gene.

== Function ==
Synaptic vesicles dock and fuse in the active zone of the plasma membrane at chemical synapses. The presynaptic cytoskeletal matrix (PCM), which is associated with the active zone and is situated between synaptic vesicles, is thought to be involved in maintaining the neurotransmitter release site in register with the postsynaptic reception apparatus. The cycling of synaptic vesicles is a multistep process involving a number of proteins (see MIM 603215). Among the components of the PCM that orchestrate these events are Bassoon (BSN; MIM 604020), RIM (RIMS1; MIM 606629), Oboe (RIMS2; MIM 606630), and Piccolo (PCLO).[supplied by OMIM]

== Interactions ==
The protein product of PCLO called Piccolo has been shown to interact with number of proteins including GIT1, the F-actin-binding protein Abp1, PRA1, TRIO, DAAM1, and Profilin.

== Clinical relevance ==
Recurrent mutations in this gene have been associated to cases of diffuse large B-cell lymphoma. Recent evidence has shown that a homozygous, nonsense PCLO mutation is the genetic cause of the autosomal recessive neurodegenerative disorder, pontocerebellar hypoplasia type III (PCH3).
