= Liprin-alpha-1 =

Protein-coding gene in the species Homo sapiens

PPFIA1

Identifiers
- Aliases: PPFIA1, LIP.1, LIP1, LIPRIN, PTPRF interacting protein alpha 1
- External IDs: OMIM: 611054; MGI: 1924750; GeneCards: PPFIA1
Available structures
PDB	Human UniProt search: PDBe RCSB
PDB	List of PDB id codes 1N7F

Gene location (Human)
Chr.	Chromosome 11 (human)
Band	11q13.3	Start	70,270,690 bp
Band	11q13.3	End	70,385,312 bp

Gene location (Mouse)
Chr.	Chromosome 7 (mouse)
Band	7|7 F5	Start	144,030,495 bp
Band	7|7 F5	End	144,107,466 bp
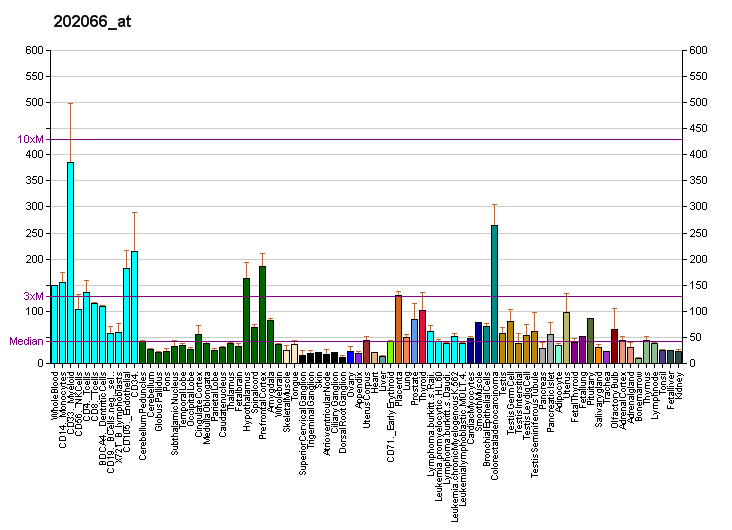

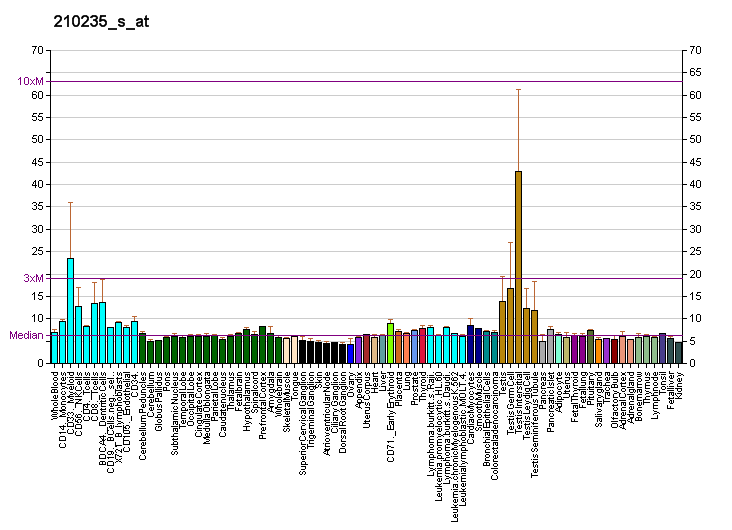

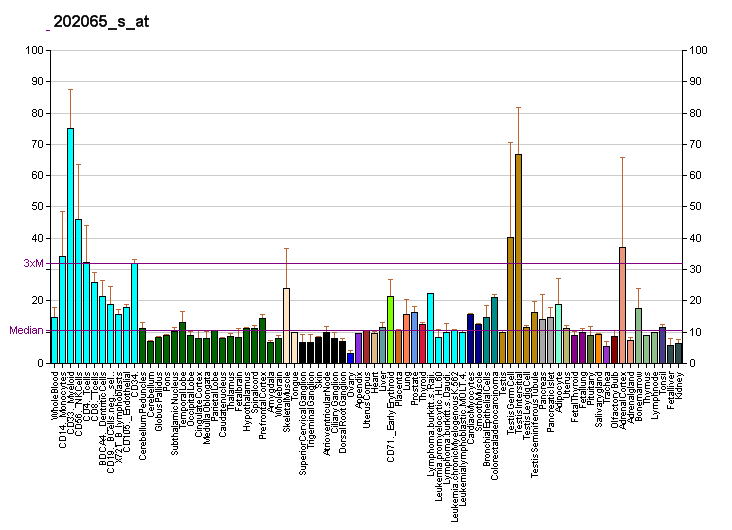
RNA expression pattern
Bgee	Human / Mouse (ortholog); Top expressed in: sural nerve; oocyte; secondary oocyte; buccal mucosa cell; sperm; Achilles tendon; endothelial cell; Epithelium of choroid plexus; tibia; visceral pleura / Top expressed in: zygote; secondary oocyte; genital tubercle; tail of embryo; primary oocyte; ventricular zone; superior cervical ganglion; lip; esophagus; hair follicle; More reference expression data
BioGPS	More reference expression data
Gene ontology
Molecular function	protein binding; signal transducer activity
Cellular component	presynaptic active zone; focal adhesion; cytoplasm; cytosol; axon; dendrite; protein-containing complex
Biological process	cell-matrix adhesion; negative regulation of stress fiber assembly; signal transduction; negative regulation of protein localization to plasma membrane; neurotransmitter secretion; glutamate secretion
Sources:Amigo / QuickGO
Orthologs
Databases	NCBI: entry; OMA: entry
Species	Human	Mouse
Entrez	8500	233977
Ensembl	ENSG00000131626; ENSG00000288198	ENSMUSG00000037519
UniProt	Q13136	n/a
RefSeq (mRNA)	NM_003626; NM_177423; NM_001378006	NM_001033319; NM_001195086
RefSeq (protein)	NP_003617; NP_803172; NP_001364935	n/a
Location (UCSC)	Chr 11: 70.27 – 70.39 Mb	Chr 7: 144.03 – 144.11 Mb
PubMed search
- Wikidata
View/Edit Human	View/Edit Mouse

Liprin-alpha-1 is a protein that in humans is encoded by the PPFIA1 gene.

== Function ==
The protein encoded by this gene is a member of the LAR protein tyrosine phosphatase-interacting protein (liprin) family. Liprins interact with members of LAR family of transmembrane protein tyrosine phosphatases, which are known to be important for axon guidance and mammary gland development. This protein binds to the intracellular membrane-distal phosphatase domain of tyrosine phosphatase LAR, and appears to localize LAR to cell focal adhesions. This interaction may regulate the disassembly of focal adhesion and thus help orchestrate cell-matrix interactions. Alternatively spliced transcript variants encoding distinct isoforms have been described.

== Interactions ==
Protein tyrosine phosphatase, receptor type, f polypeptide (PTPRF), interacting protein (liprin), alpha 1 has been shown to interact with:

- ERC2,
- GIT1,
- GRIP2,
- PPFIBP1,
- PPP2R5D,
- PTPRD,
- PTPRF, and
- PTPRS.
