= UNC13B =

Protein-coding gene in the species Homo sapiens

Identifiers
- Aliases: UNC13B, MUNC13, UNC13, Unc13h2, unc-13 homolog B (C. elegans), unc-13 homolog B, munc13-2
- External IDs: OMIM: 605836; MGI: 1342278; GeneCards: UNC13B

Gene location (Human)
Chr.	Chromosome 9 (human)
Band	9p13.3	Start	35,161,992 bp
Band	9p13.3	End	35,405,338 bp

Gene location (Mouse)
Chr.	Chromosome 4 (mouse)
Band	4|4 A5	Start	43,058,953 bp
Band	4|4 A5	End	43,264,871 bp
RNA expression pattern
Bgee	Human / Mouse (ortholog); Top expressed in: right lung; pancreatic ductal cell; lower lobe of lung; retinal pigment epithelium; sperm; upper lobe of lung; upper lobe of left lung; palpebral conjunctiva; seminal vesicula; epithelium of esophagus / Top expressed in: submandibular gland; neural layer of retina; lacrimal gland; saccule; epithelium of lens; pineal gland; secondary oocyte; lobe of prostate; parotid gland; zygote; More reference expression data
BioGPS	n/a
Gene ontology
Molecular function	metal ion binding; protein binding; calmodulin binding; diacylglycerol binding; GTP-dependent protein binding; calcium ion binding; phospholipid binding; syntaxin-1 binding
Cellular component	cytosol; neuromuscular junction; plasma membrane; synapse; cell junction; cytoplasm; Golgi apparatus; membrane; early phagosome; terminal bouton; calyx of Held; presynaptic active zone; ribbon synapse; presynapse; hippocampal mossy fiber to CA3 synapse; glutamatergic synapse; synaptic vesicle membrane; presynaptic membrane; presynaptic active zone cytoplasmic component
Biological process	exocytosis; intracellular signal transduction; synaptic vesicle docking; positive regulation of synaptic vesicle priming; synaptic transmission, glutamatergic; regulation of short-term neuronal synaptic plasticity; positive regulation of inhibitory postsynaptic potential; neuromuscular junction development; synaptic vesicle priming; innervation; chemical synaptic transmission; synaptic vesicle exocytosis; negative regulation of synaptic plasticity; positive regulation of apoptotic process; positive regulation of protein secretion; cellular response to glucose stimulus; phagosome maturation; positive regulation of defense response to bacterium; presynaptic dense core vesicle exocytosis; synaptic vesicle maturation; dense core granule priming; neurotransmitter secretion; glutamate secretion; acrosomal vesicle exocytosis
Sources:Amigo / QuickGO
Orthologs
Databases	NCBI: entry; OMA: entry
Species	Human	Mouse
Entrez	10497	22249
Ensembl	ENSG00000198722	ENSMUSG00000028456
UniProt	O14795	Q9Z1N9
RefSeq (mRNA)	NM_006377; NM_001330653; NM_001371186; NM_001371187; NM_001371188 NM_001371189; NM_001387551; NM_001387553; NM_001387554; NM_001387555	NM_001081413; NM_021468; NM_001310758
RefSeq (protein)	NP_001317582; NP_006368; NP_001358115; NP_001358116; NP_001358117 NP_001358118	NP_001074882; NP_001297687; NP_067443; NP_001371035
Location (UCSC)	Chr 9: 35.16 – 35.41 Mb	Chr 4: 43.06 – 43.26 Mb
PubMed search
- Wikidata
View/Edit Human	View/Edit Mouse

Protein unc-13 homolog B is a protein that in humans is encoded by the UNC13B gene and in mice by the Munc13-2 gene

== Function ==
This gene is expressed in the kidney cortical epithelial cells and is upregulated by hyperglycemia. The encoded protein shares a high level of similarity to the rat homolog, and contains 3 C2 domains and a diacylglycerol-binding C1 domain. Hyperglycemia increases the levels of diacylglycerol, which has been shown to induce apoptosis in cells transfected with this gene and thus contribute to the renal cell complications of hyperglycemia. Studies in other species also indicate a role for this protein in the priming step of synaptic vesicle exocytosis.

== Interactions ==
UNC13B has been shown to interact with:

- DOC2A,
- RIMS1,
- SPTBN2,
- STX1A, and
- STX1B.
