= List of acts of the 107th United States Congress =

The acts of the 107th United States Congress includes all Acts of Congress and ratified treaties by the 107th United States Congress, which lasted from January 3, 2001, to January 3, 2003,

Acts include public and private laws, which are enacted after being passed by Congress and signed by the President, however if the President vetoes a bill it can still be enacted by a two-thirds vote in both houses. The Senate alone considers treaties, which are ratified by a two-thirds vote.

== Summary of actions ==
President George W. Bush did not veto any bills during this Congress.

== Public laws ==
Public law number (Linked to Wikisource)	Date of enactment	Official short title	Description	Link to Legislink.org
107-1	February 15, 2001	(No short title)	Recognizing the 90th birthday of Ronald Reagan	Pub. L. 107–1 (text) (PDF)
107-2	March 13, 2001	(No short title)	An act to designate the United States courthouse located at 1 Courthouse Way in Boston, Massachusetts, as the "John Joseph Moakley United States Courthouse"	Pub. L. 107–2 (text) (PDF)
107-3	March 13, 2001	(No short title)	An act affecting the representation of the majority and minority membership of the Senate Members of the Joint Economic Committee	Pub. L. 107–3 (text) (PDF)
107-4	March 16, 2001	(No short title)	Providing for the appointment of Walter E. Massey as a citizen regent of the Board of Regents of the Smithsonian Institution	Pub. L. 107–4 (text) (PDF)
107-5	March 20, 2001	(No short title)	Joint resolution providing for congressional disapproval of the rule submitted by the Department of Labor under chapter 8 of title 5, United States Code, relating to ergonomics	Pub. L. 107–5 (text) (PDF)
107-6	April 12, 2001	(No short title)	An act to designate the facility of the United States Postal Service located at 620 Jacaranda Street in Lanai City, Hawaii, as the "Goro Hokama Post Office Building"	Pub. L. 107–6 (text) (PDF)
107-7	April 12, 2001	(No short title)	An act to designate the facility of the United States Postal Service located at 2305 Minton Road in West Melbourne, Florida, as the "Ronald W. Reagan Post Office of West Melbourne, Florida"	Pub. L. 107–7 (text) (PDF)
107-8	May 11, 2001	(No short title)	An act to extend for 11 additional months the period for which chapter 12 of title 11 of the United States Code is reenacted	Pub. L. 107–8 (text) (PDF)
107-9	May 24, 2001	Animal Disease Risk Assessment, Prevention, and Control Act of 2001	A bill to establish a Federal interagency task force for the purpose of coordinating actions to prevent the outbreak of bovine spongiform encephalopathy (commonly known as "mad cow disease") and foot-and-mouth disease in the United States; Mad Cow and Related Diseases Prevention Act of 2001; Mad Cow Disease bill	Pub. L. 107–9 (text) (PDF)
107-10	May 28, 2001	(No short title)	Concerning the participation of Taiwan in the World Health Organization	Pub. L. 107–10 (text) (PDF)
107-11	May 28, 2001	(No short title)	An act to expedite the construction of the World War II memorial in the District of Columbia	Pub. L. 107–11 (text) (PDF)
107-12	May 30, 2001	Public Safety Officer Medal of Valor Act of 2001	To authorize the Public Safety Officer Medal of Valor, and for other purposes	Pub. L. 107–12 (text) (PDF)
107-13	June 3, 2001	(No short title)	An act to authorize the Secretary of the Interior and the Secretary of Agriculture to use funds appropriated for wildland fire management in the Department of the Interior and Related Agencies Appropriations Act, 2001, to reimburse the United States Fish and Wildlife Service and the National Marine Fisheries Service to facilitate the interagency cooperation required under the Endangered Species Act of 1973 in connection with wildland fire management	Pub. L. 107–13 (text) (PDF)
107-14	June 5, 2001	Veterans' Survivor Benefits Improvements Act of 2001	An act to amend title 38, United States Code, to expand eligibility for CHAMPVA, to provide for family coverage and retroactive expansion of the increase in maximum benefits under Servicemembers' Group Life Insurance, to make technical amendments, and for other purposes; To amend title 38, United States Code, to improve programs of educational assistance, to expand programs of transition assistance and outreach to departing servicemembers, veterans, and dependents, to increase burial benefits, to provide for family coverage under Servicemembers' Group Life Insurance, and for other purposes; Veterans Opportunities Act of 2001; Veterans' Opportunities Act of 2001; Improving Veterans' Programs bill	Pub. L. 107–14 (text) (PDF)
107-15	June 5, 2001	Fallen Hero Survivor Benefit Fairness Act of 2001	To amend the Taxpayer Relief Act of 1997 to provide for consistent treatment of survivor benefits for public safety officers killed in the line of duty; Police Survivor Benefits bill	Pub. L. 107–15 (text) (PDF)
107-16	June 7, 2001	Economic Growth and Tax Relief Reconciliation Act of 2001	To provide for reconciliation pursuant to section 104 of the concurrent resolution on the budget for fiscal year 2002; Adoption Tax Credit bill; Estate Tax Phase Out bill; IRAs Increase Contribution Limits bill; Marriage Tax Penalty bill; Retirement Savings bill; Tax Cut Reconciliation bill; Tuition Deduction bill	Pub. L. 107–16 (text) (PDF)
107-17	June 26, 2001	Veterans' Opportunities Act of 2001	An act to extend for 4 additional months the period for which chapter 12 of title 11 of the United States Code is reenacted	Pub. L. 107–17 (text) (PDF)
107-18	July 5, 2001	(No short title)	An act to clarify the authority of the Department of Housing and Urban Development with respect to the use of fees during fiscal year 2001 for the manufactured housing program	Pub. L. 107–18 (text) (PDF)
107-19	July 10, 2001	(No short title)	An act to authorize funding for the National 4-H Program Centennial Initiative	Pub. L. 107–19 (text) (PDF)
107-20	July 24, 2001	Supplemental Appropriations Act, 2001	Making supplemental appropriations for the fiscal year ending September 30, 2001, and for other purposes; 2001 Supplemental Appropriations Act; Supplemental Appropriations, FY2001 bill	Pub. L. 107–20 (text) (PDF)
107-21	July 26, 2001	(No short title)	An act to honor Paul D. Coverdell	Pub. L. 107–21 (text) (PDF)
107-22	July 26, 2001	(No short title)	An act to amend the Internal Revenue Code of 1986 to rename the education individual retirement accounts as the Coverdell education savings account	Pub. L. 107–22 (text) (PDF)
107-23	August 3, 2001	(No short title)	An act to designate the Federal building located at 6230 Van Nuys Boulevard in Van Nuys, California, as the "James C. Corman Federal Building"	Pub. L. 107–23 (text) (PDF)
107-24	August 3, 2001	ILSA Extension Act of 2001	To extend the authorities of the Iran and Libya Sanctions Act of 1996 until 2006; To extend the authorities of the Iran and Libya Sanctions Act of 1996 until 2006, and for other purposes	Pub. L. 107–24 (text) (PDF)
107-25	August 13, 2001	Crop Year 2001 Agricultural Economic Assistance Act	To respond to the continuing economic crisis adversely affecting American agricultural producers; Farm Aid bill; Farm Assistance bill	Pub. L. 107–25 (text) (PDF)
107-26	August 17, 2001	(No short title)	An act to reauthorize the Tropical Forest Conservation Act of 1998 through fiscal year 2004, and for other purposes	Pub. L. 107–26 (text) (PDF)
107-27	August 20, 2001	Federal Firefighters Retirement Age Fairness Act	To amend title 5, United States Code, to provide that the mandatory separation age for Federal firefighters be made the same as the age that applies with respect to Federal law enforcement officers	Pub. L. 107–27 (text) (PDF)
107-28	August 20, 2001	(No short title)	An act to direct the Secretary of the Interior to convey a former Bureau of Land Management administrative site to the city of Carson City, Nevada, for use as a senior center	Pub. L. 107–28 (text) (PDF)
107-29	August 20, 2001	(No short title)	An act to designate the facility of the United States Postal Service located at 5927 Southwest 70th Street in Miami, Florida, as the "Marjory Williams Scrivens Post Office"	Pub. L. 107–29 (text) (PDF)
107-30	August 20, 2001	(No short title)	An act to provide further protections for the watershed of the Little Sandy River as part of the Bull Run Watershed Management Unit, Oregon, and for other purposes	Pub. L. 107–30 (text) (PDF)
107-31	August 20, 2001	(No short title)	An act to designate the Federal building and United States courthouse located at 504 West Hamilton Street in Allentown, Pennsylvania, as the "Edward N. Cahn Federal Building and United States Courthouse"	Pub. L. 107–31 (text) (PDF)
107-32	August 20, 2001	(No short title)	An act to designate the facility of the United States Postal Service located at 1030 South Church Street in Asheboro, North Carolina, as the "W. Joe Trogdon Post Office Building"	Pub. L. 107–32 (text) (PDF)
107-33	August 20, 2001	(No short title)	An act to designate the United States courthouse located at 40 Centre Street in New York, New York, as the "Thurgood Marshall United States Courthouse"	Pub. L. 107–33 (text) (PDF)
107-34	August 20, 2001	(No short title)	An act to designate the facility of the United States Postal Service located at 113 South Main Street in Sylvania, Georgia, as the "G. Elliot Hagan Post Office Building"	Pub. L. 107–34 (text) (PDF)
107-35	August 20, 2001	(No short title)	An act to designate the facility of the United States Postal Service located at 419 Rutherford Avenue, N.E., in Roanoke, Virginia, as the "M. Caldwell Butler Post Office Building"	Pub. L. 107–35 (text) (PDF)
107-36	August 20, 2001	(No short title)	An act to designate the facility of the United States Postal Service located at 2719 South Webster Street in Kokomo, Indiana, as the "Elwood Haynes 'Bud' Hillis Post Office Building"	Pub. L. 107–36 (text) (PDF)
107-37	September 18, 2001	(No short title)	An act to provide for the expedited payment of certain benefits for a public safety officer who was killed or suffered a catastrophic injury as a direct and proximate result of a personal injury sustained in the line of duty in connection with the terrorist attacks of September 11, 2001	Pub. L. 107–37 (text) (PDF)
107-38	September 18, 2001	(No short title)	Making emergency supplemental appropriations for the fiscal year 2001 for additional disaster assistance, for anti-terrorism initiatives, and for assistance in the recovery from the tragedy that occurred on September 11, 2001, and for other purposes; Emergency Supplemental Appropriations bill	Pub. L. 107–38 (text) (PDF)
107-39	September 18, 2001	(No short title)	Joint resolution expressing the sense of the Senate and House of Representatives regarding the terrorist attacks launched against the United States on September 11, 2001	Pub. L. 107–39 (text) (PDF)
107-40	September 18, 2001	Authorization for Use of Military Force	A joint resolution to authorize the use of United States Armed Forces against those responsible for the recent attacks launched against the United States; Military Force Authorization resolution	Pub. L. 107–40 (text) (PDF)
107-41	September 18, 2001	(No short title)	An act to establish a commission for the purpose of encouraging and providing for the commemoration of the 50th anniversary of the Supreme Court decision in Brown v. Board of Education	Pub. L. 107–41 (text) (PDF)
107-42	September 22, 2001	Air Transportation Safety and System Stabilization Act	To preserve the continued viability of the United States air transportation system; September 11 Victim Compensation Fund of 2001; Airline Bailout bill; Airline Industry Financial Assistance bill; Bailout of Airlines bill; Victim Compensation Fund bill	Pub. L. 107–42 (text) (PDF)
107-43	September 28, 2001	United States-Jordan Free Trade Area Implementation Act	To implement the agreement establishing a United States-Jordan free trade area	Pub. L. 107–43 (text) (PDF)
107-44	September 28, 2001	Making continuing appropriations for the fiscal year 2002, and for other purposes	Continuing Appropriation FY2002 (First)	Pub. L. 107–44 (text) (PDF)
107-45	October 1, 2001	September 11th Victim Compensation Fund of 2001	An act to amend the Immigration and Nationality Act to provide permanent authority for the admission of "S" visa non-immigrants	Pub. L. 107–45 (text) (PDF)
107-46	October 5, 2001	(No short title)	An act to amend the Admiral James W. Nance and Meg Donovan Foreign Relations Authorization Act, Fiscal Years 2000 and 2001, to adjust a condition on the payment of arrearages to the United Nations that sets the maximum share of any United Nations peacekeeping operation's budget that may be assessed of any country	Pub. L. 107–46 (text) (PDF)
107-47	October 5, 2001	Defense Production Act Amendments of 2001	To extend the expiration date of the Defense Production Act of 1950, and for other purposes	Pub. L. 107–47 (text) (PDF)
107-48	October 12, 2001	Making further continuing appropriations for the fiscal year 2002, and for other purposes	Continuing Appropriation FY2002 (Second)	Pub. L. 107–48 (text) (PDF)
107-49	October 15, 2001	(No short title)	An act to designate the Federal building and United States courthouse located at 121 West Spring Street in New Albany, Indiana, as the "Lee H. Hamilton Federal Building and United States Courthouse"	Pub. L. 107–49 (text) (PDF)
107-50	October 15, 2001	Small Business Technology Transfer Program Reauthorization Act of 2001	To reauthorize the Small Business Technology Transfer Program, and for other purposes	Pub. L. 107–50 (text) (PDF)
107-51	October 16, 2001	(No short title)	Memorializing fallen firefighters by lowering the American flag to half-staff in honor of the National Fallen Firefighters Memorial Service in Emmitsburg, Maryland	Pub. L. 107–51 (text) (PDF)
107-52	October 16, 2001	(No short title)	Approving the extension of nondiscriminatory treatment with respect to the products of the Socialist Republic of Vietnam	Pub. L. 107–52 (text) (PDF)
107-53	October 22, 2001	Making further continuing appropriations for the fiscal year 2002, and for other purposes	Continuing Appropriation FY2002 (Third)	Pub. L. 107–53 (text) (PDF)
107-54	October 24, 2001	(No short title)	Joint resolution providing for the reappointment of Anne d'Harnoncourt as a citizen regent of the Board of Regents of the Smithsonian Institution	Pub. L. 107–54 (text) (PDF)
107-55	October 24, 2001	(No short title)	Joint resolution providing for the appointment of Roger W. Sant as a citizen regent of the Board of Regents of the Smithsonian Institution	Pub. L. 107–55 (text) (PDF)
107-56	October 26, 2001	Uniting and Strengthening America by Providing Appropriate Tools Required to Intercept and Obstruct Terrorism (USA PATRIOT ACT) Act of 2001	To deter and punish terrorist acts in the United States and around the world, to enhance law enforcement investigatory tools, and for other purposes; Crimes Against Charitable Americans Act of 2001; Critical Infrastructures Protection Act of 2001; First Responders Assistance Act; International Money Laundering Abatement and Financial Anti-Terrorism Act of 2001; PATRIOT bill; USA PATRIOT bill	Pub. L. 107–56 (text) (PDF)
107-57	October 27, 2001	International Money Laundering Abatement and Financial Anti-Terrorism Act of 2001	An act to authorize the President to exercise waivers of foreign assistance restrictions with respect to Pakistan through September 30, 2003, and for other purposes	Pub. L. 107–57 (text) (PDF)
107-58	October 31, 2001	(No short title)	Making further continuing appropriations for the fiscal year 2002, and for other purposesContinuing Appropriation FY2002 (Fourth)	Pub. L. 107–58 (text) (PDF)
107-59	November 5, 2001	Great Falls Historic District Study Act of 2001	To authorize the Secretary of the Interior to study the suitability and feasibility of designating the Great Falls Historic District in Paterson, New Jersey, as a unit of the National Park System, and for other purposes	Pub. L. 107–59 (text) (PDF)
107-60	November 5, 2001	William Howard Taft National Historic Site Boundary Adjustment Act of 2001	To adjust the boundary of the William Howard Taft National Historic Site in the State of Ohio, to authorize an exchange of land in connection with the historic site, and for other purposes	Pub. L. 107–60 (text) (PDF)
107-61	November 5, 2001	(No short title)	An act to authorize the Government of the Czech Republic to establish a memorial to honor Tomas G. Masaryk in the District of Columbia	Pub. L. 107–61 (text) (PDF)
107-62	November 5, 2001	(No short title)	An act to authorize the Adams Memorial Foundation to establish a commemorative work on Federal land in the District of Columbia and its environs to honor former President John Adams and his legacy	Pub. L. 107–62 (text) (PDF)
107-63	November 5, 2001	Department of the Interior and Related Agencies Appropriations Act, 2002	Making appropriations for the Department of the Interior and related agencies for the fiscal year ending September 30, 2002, and for other purposes	Pub. L. 107–63 (text) (PDF)
107-64	November 5, 2001	Military Construction Appropriations Act, 2002	Making appropriations for military construction, family housing, and base realignment and closure for the Department of Defense for the fiscal year ending September 30, 2002, and for other purposes; Military Construction FY2002 Appropriations bill	Pub. L. 107–64 (text) (PDF)
107-65	November 6, 2001	Eight Mile River Wild and Scenic River Study Act of 2001	To amend the Wild and Scenic Rivers Act to designate a segment of the Eight Mile River in the State of Connecticut for study for potential addition to the National Wild and Scenic Rivers System, and for other purposes; To amend the Wild and Scenic Rivers Act to designate a segment of the Eightmile River in the State of Connecticut for study for potential addition to the National Wild and Scenic Rivers System, and for other purposes	Pub. L. 107–65 (text) (PDF)
107-66	November 12, 2001	Energy and Water Development Appropriations Act, 2002	Making appropriations for energy and water development for the fiscal year ending September 30, 2002, and for other purposes	Pub. L. 107–66 (text) (PDF)
107-67	November 12, 2001	Treasury and General Government Appropriations Act, 2002	Making appropriations for the Treasury Department, the United States Postal Service, the Executive Office of the President, and certain Independent Agencies, for the fiscal year ending September 30, 2002, and for other purposes; 9/11 Heroes Stamp Act of 2001; Breast Cancer Research Stamp Act of 2001; Executive Office Appropriations Act, 2002; Independent Agencies Appropriations Act, 2002; Postal Service Appropriations Act, 2002; Stamp Out Domestic Violence Act of 2001; Treasury Department Appropriations Act, 2002; Appropriations bill FY2002, Treasury, Postal Service; Postal Service FY2002 Appropriations bill	Pub. L. 107–67 (text) (PDF)
107-68	November 12, 2001	Legislative Branch Appropriations Act, 2002	Making appropriations for the Legislative Branch for the fiscal year ending September 30, 2002, and for other purposes; Congressional Operations Appropriations Act, 2002	Pub. L. 107–68 (text) (PDF)
107-69	November 12, 2001	Congressional Operations Appropriations Act, 2002	An act to amend the Reclamation Recreation Management Act of 1992 in order to provide for the security of dams, facilities, and resources under the jurisdiction of the Bureau of Reclamation	Pub. L. 107–69 (text) (PDF)
107-70	November 17, 2001	Making further continuing appropriations for the fiscal year 2002, and for other purposes	Continuing Appropriation FY2002 (Fifth)	Pub. L. 107–70 (text) (PDF)
107-71	November 19, 2001	Aviation and Transportation Security Act	A bill to improve aviation security, and for other purposes; Aviation Security Act; Flight Deck Security Act of 2001; Federalize Aviation Security bill; Sky Marshals bill	Pub. L. 107–71 (text) (PDF)
107-72	November 20, 2001	Need-Based Educational Aid Act of 2001	An act to amend the Improving America's Schools Act of 1994 to extend the favorable treatment of need-based educational aid under the antitrust laws, and for other purposes; To amend the Improving America's Schools Act of 1994 to make permanent the favorable treatment of need-based educational aid under the antitrust laws	Pub. L. 107–72 (text) (PDF)
107-73	November 26, 2001	Departments of Veterans Affairs and Housing and Urban Development, and Independent Agencies Appropriations Act, 2002	Making appropriations for the Departments of Veterans Affairs and Housing and Urban Development, and for sundry independent agencies, boards, commissions, corporations, and offices for the fiscal year ending September 30, 2002, and for other purposes; Veterans Affairs FY2002 Appropriations bill	Pub. L. 107–73 (text) (PDF)
107-74	November 28, 2001	Flight Deck Security Act of 2001	An act to prevent the elimination of certain reports	Pub. L. 107–74 (text) (PDF)
107-75	November 28, 2001	Internet Tax Nondiscrimination Act	To extend the moratorium enacted by the Internet Tax Freedom Act through 2006, and for other purposes; To extend the moratorium enacted by the Internet Tax Freedom Act through November 1, 2003	Pub. L. 107–75 (text) (PDF)
107-76	November 28, 2001	Agriculture, Rural Development, Food and Drug Administration, and Related Agencies Appropriations Act, 2002	Making appropriations for Agriculture, Rural Development, Food and Drug Administration, and Related Agencies programs for the fiscal year ending September 30, 2002, and for other purposes; Agriculture FY2002 Appropriations bill	Pub. L. 107–76 (text) (PDF)
107-77	November 28, 2001	Departments of Commerce, Justice, and State, the Judiciary, and Related Agencies Appropriations Act, 2002	Making appropriations for the Departments of Commerce, Justice, and State, the Judiciary, and related agencies for the fiscal year ending September 30, 2002, and for other purposes; Combating Terrorism Act of 2001; Department of Commerce and Related Agencies Appropriations Act, 2002; Department of Commerce and Related Agencies Appropriations Act, 2002; Department of Justice Appropriations Act, 2002; Department of State and Related Agency Appropriations Act, 2002; Department of State and Related Agency Appropriations Act, 2002; Judiciary Appropriations Act, 2002; 2001 Combating Terrorism bill; Appropriations bill FY2002, Commerce, Justice, State; Commerce Department FY2002 Appropriations bill; Justice Department FY2002 Appropriations bill; State Department FY2002 Appropriations bill; United States Prisoners of War bill	Pub. L. 107–77 (text) (PDF)
107-78	November 28, 2001	Judiciary Appropriations Act, 2002	An act to provide authority to the Federal Power Marketing Administrations to reduce vandalism and destruction of property, and for other purposes	Pub. L. 107–78 (text) (PDF)
107-79	December 7, 2001	Making further continuing appropriations for the fiscal year 2002, and for other purposes	Continuing Appropriation FY2002 (Sixth)	Pub. L. 107–79 (text) (PDF)
107-80	December 12, 2001	(No short title)	An act to designate the Federal building and United States courthouse located at 550 West Fort Street in Boise, Idaho, as the "James A. McClure Federal Building and United States Courthouse"	Pub. L. 107–80 (text) (PDF)
107-81	December 12, 2001	Afghan Women and Children Relief Act of 2001	A bill to authorize the provision of educational and health care assistance to the women and children of Afghanistan; Afghan Women and Children Relief bill	Pub. L. 107–81 (text) (PDF)
107-82	December 14, 2001	(No short title)	An act to extend the authorization of the Drug-Free Communities Support Program for an additional 5 years, to authorize a National Community Antidrug Coalition Institute, and for other purposes	Pub. L. 107–82 (text) (PDF)
107-83	December 15, 2001	Making further continuing appropriations for the fiscal year 2002, and for other purposes	Continuing Appropriation FY2002 (Seventh)	Pub. L. 107–83 (text) (PDF)
107-84	December 18, 2001	MD-CARE Act	To amend the Public Health Service Act to provide for research and services with respect to Duchenne muscular dystrophy; To amend the Public Health Service Act to provide for research with respect to various forms of muscular dystrophy, including Duchenne, Becker, limb girdle, congenital, facioscapulohumeral, myotonic, oculopharyngeal, distal, and Emery–Dreifuss muscular dystrophies; DMD CARE Act; Duchenne Muscular Dystrophy Childhood Assistance, Research and Education Amendments of 2001; Muscular Dystrophy Community Assistance Research and Education Amendments of 2001	Pub. L. 107–84 (text) (PDF)
107-85	December 18, 2001	Muscular Dystrophy Community Assistance Research and Education Amendments of 2001	An act to designate the facility of the United States Postal Service located at 4270 John Marr Drive in Annandale, Virginia, as the "Stan Parris Post Office Building"	Pub. L. 107–85 (text) (PDF)
107-86	December 18, 2001	(No short title)	An act to designate the facility of the United States Postal Service located at 2853 Candler Road in Decatur, Georgia, as the "Earl T. Shinhoster Post Office"	Pub. L. 107–86 (text) (PDF)
107-87	December 18, 2001	Department of Transportation and Related Agencies Appropriations Act, 2002	Making appropriations for the Department of Transportation and related agencies for the fiscal year ending September 30, 2002, and for other purposes	Pub. L. 107–87 (text) (PDF)
107-88	December 18, 2001	(No short title)	An act to redesignate the facility of the United States Postal Service located at 5472 Crenshaw Boulevard in Los Angeles, California, as the 'Congressman Julian C. Dixon Post Office'	Pub. L. 107–88 (text) (PDF)
107-89	December 18, 2001	(No short title)	Amending title 36, United States Code, to designate September 11 as Patriot Day (Patriot Day resolution)	Pub. L. 107–89 (text) (PDF)
107-90	December 21, 2001	Railroad Retirement and Survivors' Improvement Act of 2001	An Act to modernize the financing of the railroad retirement system and to provide enhanced benefits to employees and beneficiaries; To provide for pension reform, and for other purposes; Comprehensive Retirement Security and Pension Reform Act of 2001; Pension Reform bill; Railroad Retirement and Survivors' Improvement bill; Retirement Savings bill	Pub. L. 107–90 (text) (PDF)
107-91	December 21, 2001	Detroit River International Wildlife Refuge Establishment Act	To provide for the establishment of the Detroit River International Wildlife Refuge in the State of Michigan, and for other purposes; Detroit River International Wildlife Refuge Establishment Act	Pub. L. 107–91 (text) (PDF)
107-92	December 21, 2001	(No short title)	An act to designate the facility of the United States Postal Service located at 8588 Richmond Highway in Alexandria, Virginia, as the 'Herb Harris Post Office Building'	Pub. L. 107–92 (text) (PDF)
107-93	December 21, 2001	(No short title)	An act to amend the charter of Southeastern University of the District of Columbia	Pub. L. 107–93 (text) (PDF)
107-94	December 21, 2001	Veterans' Compensation Rate Amendments of 2001	An act to amend title 38, United States Code, to provide a cost-of-living adjustment in the rates of disability compensation for veterans with service-connected disabilities and the rates of dependency and indemnity compensation for survivors of such veterans; To amend title 38, United States Code, to make various improvements to veterans benefits programs under laws administered by the Secretary of Veterans Affairs, and for other purposes; Veterans Benefits Act of 2001	Pub. L. 107–94 (text) (PDF)
107-95	December 21, 2001	Homeless Veterans Comprehensive Assistance Act of 2001	To amend title 38, United States Code, to revise, improve, and consolidate provisions of law providing benefits and services for homeless veterans; Homeless Veterans Assistance Act of 2001; Stuart Collick—Heather French Henry Homeless Veterans Assistance Act	Pub. L. 107–95 (text) (PDF)
107-96	December 21, 2001	District of Columbia Appropriations Act, 2002	Making appropriations for the government of the District of Columbia and other activities chargeable in whole or in part against the revenues of said District for the fiscal year ending September 30, 2002, and for other purposes; District of Columbia FY2002 Appropriations bill	Pub. L. 107–96 (text) (PDF)
107-97	December 21, 2001	Making further continuing appropriations for the fiscal year 2002, and for other purposes	Continuing Appropriation FY2002 (Eighth)	Pub. L. 107–97 (text) (PDF)
107-98	December 21, 2001	(No short title)	Appointing the day for the convening of the second session of the One Hundred Seventh Congress	Pub. L. 107–98 (text) (PDF)
107-99	December 21, 2001	Zimbabwe Democracy and Economic Recovery Act of 2001	A bill to provide for a transition to democracy and to promote economic recovery in Zimbabwe; Zimbabwe Democracy and Economic Recovery Act of 2001	Pub. L. 107–99 (text) (PDF)
107-100	December 21, 2001	Small Business Investment Company Amendments Act of 2001	A bill to amend the Small Business Investment Act of 1958, and for other purposes	Pub. L. 107–100 (text) (PDF)
107-101	December 21, 2001	(No short title)	Joint resolution providing for the appointment of Patricia Q. Stonesifer as a citizen regent of the Board of Regents of the Smithsonian Institution	Pub. L. 107–101 (text) (PDF)
107-102	December 27, 2001	(No short title)	Regarding the use of the trust land and resources of the Confederated Tribes of the Warm Springs Reservation of Oregon	Pub. L. 107–102 (text) (PDF)
107-103	December 27, 2001	Veterans Education and Benefits Expansion Act of 2001	A bill to amend title 38, United States Code, to modify and improve authorities relating to education benefits, burial benefits, and vocational rehabilitation benefits for veterans, to modify certain authorities relating to the United States Court of Appeals for Veterans Claims, and for other purposes; To amend title 38, United States Code, to increase the amount of educational benefits for veterans under the Montgomery GI Bill; 21st Century Montgomery GI Bill Enhancement Act; Veterans' Benefits Improvement Act of 2001; Veterans' Educational Benefits bill	Pub. L. 107–103 (text) (PDF)
107-104	December 27, 2001	Veterans' Benefits Improvement Act of 2001	An act to amend chapter 90 of title 5, United States Code, relating to Federal long-term care insurance	Pub. L. 107–104 (text) (PDF)
107-105	December 27, 2001	Administrative Simplification Compliance Act	To ensure that covered entities comply with the standards for electronic health care transactions and code sets adopted under part C of title XI of the Social Security Act, and for other purposes	Pub. L. 107–105 (text) (PDF)
107-106	December 28, 2001	National Museum of African American History and Culture Plan for Action Presidential Commission Act of 2001	To establish the National Museum of African American History and Culture Plan for Action Presidential Commission to develop a plan of action for the establishment and maintenance of the National Museum of African American History and Culture in Washington, D.C., and for other purposes	Pub. L. 107–106 (text) (PDF)
107-107	December 28, 2001	National Defense Authorization Act for Fiscal Year 2002	A bill to authorize appropriations for fiscal year 2002 for military activities of the Department of Defense, for military constructions, and for defense activities of the Department of Energy, to prescribe personnel strengths for such fiscal year for the Armed Forces, and for other purposes; Air Force Science and Technology for the 21st Century Act; Fort Irwin Military Land Withdrawal Act of 2001; Military Construction Authorization Act for Fiscal Year 2002; Rocky Flats National Wildlife Refuge Act of 2001; Department of Defense, FY2002 Authorization bill; Military Voting Rights bill	Pub. L. 107–107 (text) (PDF)
107-108	December 28, 2001	Intelligence Authorization Act for Fiscal Year 2002	To authorize appropriations for fiscal year 2002 for intelligence and intelligence-related activities of the United States Government, the Community Management Account, and the Central Intelligence Agency Retirement and Disability System, and for other purposes; Intelligence Authorization Act for Fiscal Year 2002; Intelligence Authorization bill, FY2002	Pub. L. 107–108 (text) (PDF)
107-109	January 4, 2002	Best Pharmaceuticals for Children Act	A bill to amend the Federal Food, Drug, and Cosmetic Act to improve the safety and efficacy of pharmaceuticals for children	Pub. L. 107–109 (text) (PDF)
107-110	January 8, 2002	No Child Left Behind Act of 2001	To close the achievement gap with accountability, flexibility, and choice, so that no child is left behind; 21st Century Schools Act of 2001; Academic Achievement for All Act; Access to High Standards Act; Alaska Native Educational Equity Support and Assistance Act; Alaska Native Educational Equity, Support, and Assistance Act; Alaska Native and Native Hawaiian Education Through Cultural and Historical Organizations Act; Better Education for Students and Teachers Act; Boy Scouts of America Equal Access Act; Carol M. White Physical Education Program; Charter Schools Equity Act; Dropout Prevention Act; Education Flexibility Partnership Act of 2001; Education for Democracy Act; Empowering Parents Act of 2001; English Language Acquisition, Language Enhancement, and Academic Achievement Act; English Language Proficiency and Academic Achievement Act; Enhancing Education Through Technology Act of 2001; Enhancing Public Education Through Choice Act; Equal Access to Public School Facilities Act; Excellence in Economic Education Act of 2001; Foreign Language Assistance Act of 2001; Gun-Free Schools Act; Healthy and High Performance Schools Act of 2001; Improving Language Instruction Educational Programs For Academic Achievement Act; Jacob K. Javits Gifted and Talented Students Education Act of 2001; John H. Chafee Environmental Education Act of 2001; Loan Forgiveness for Head Start Teachers Act of 2001; Local Flexibility Demonstration Act; McKinney-Vento Homeless Education Assistance Improvement Act of 2001; Native American Education Improvement Act of 2001; Native Hawaiian Education Act; Paul Coverdell Teacher Liability Protection Act of 2001; Paul Coverdell Teacher Protection Act of 2001; Paul D. Coverdell Teacher Protection Act of 2001; Performance Agreements Act; Physical Education for Progress Act; Pro-Children Act of 2001; Ready to Learn, Ready to Teach Act of 2001; Rural Education Achievement Program; Rural Education Initiative Act; Rural Technology Education Academies Act; Safe Schools for the 21st Century Act of 2001; Safe and Drug-Free Schools and Communities Act; School Environmental Protection Act of 2001; School Safety Enhancement Act of 2001; Star Schools Act; State and Local Flexibility Demonstration Act; State and Local Transferability Act; Straight A's Act; Strong Character for Strong Schools Act; Student Education Enrichment Demonstration Act; Teacher Mobility Act; Women's Educational Equity Act of 2001; ESEA Reauthorization bill; Elementary and Secondary Education Act Authorization bill	Pub. L. 107–110 (text) (PDF)
107-111	January 8, 2002	African Elephant Conservation Reauthorization Act of 2001	To reauthorize the African Elephant Conservation Act	Pub. L. 107–111 (text) (PDF)
107-112	January 8, 2002	Rhinoceros and Tiger Conservation Reauthorization Act of 2001	To reauthorize the Rhinoceros and Tiger Conservation Act of 1994	Pub. L. 107–112 (text) (PDF)
107-113	January 8, 2002	District of Columbia Police Coordination Amendment Act of 2001	To amend the National Capital Revitalization and Self-Government Improvement Act of 1997 to permit any Federal law enforcement agency to enter into a cooperative agreement with the Metropolitan Police Department of the District of Columbia to assist the department in carrying out crime prevention and law enforcement activities in the District of Columbia if deemed appropriate by the Chief of the department and the United States Attorney for the District of Columbia, and for other purposes	Pub. L. 107–113 (text) (PDF)
107-114	January 8, 2002	District of Columbia Family Court Act of 2001	To amend title 11, District of Columbia Code, to redesignate the Family Division of the Superior Court of the District of Columbia as the Family Court of the Superior Court, to recruit and retain trained and experienced judges to serve in the Family Court, to promote consistency and efficiency in the assignment of judges to the Family Court and in the consideration of actions and proceedings in the Family Court, and for other purposes	Pub. L. 107–114 (text) (PDF)
107-115	January 10, 2002	Foreign Operations, Export Financing, and Related Programs Appropriations Act, 2002	Making appropriations for foreign operations, export financing, and related programs for the fiscal year ending September 30, 2002, and for other purposes; Federal Investigation Enhancement Act of 2001; Kenneth M. Ludden Foreign Operations, Export Financing and Related Programs Appropriations Act, 2002; Kenneth M. Ludden Foreign Operations, Export Financing, and Related Programs Appropriations Act, Fiscal Year 2002; Foreign Operations FY2002 Appropriations bill	Pub. L. 107–115 (text) (PDF)
107-116	January 10, 2002	Departments of Labor, Health and Human Services, and Education, and Related Agencies Appropriations Act, 2002	Making appropriations for the Departments of Labor, Health and Human Services, and Education, and related agencies for the fiscal year ending September 30, 2002, and for other purposes; Department of Education Appropriations Act, 2002; Department of Health and Human Services Appropriations Act, 2002; Department of Labor Appropriations Act, 2002; Donald J. Cohen National Child Traumatic Stress Initiative; Mark-to-Market Extension Act of 2001; Mental Health Equitable Treatment Act of 2001	Pub. L. 107–116 (text) (PDF)
107-117	January 10, 2002	Department of Defense and Emergency Supplemental Appropriations for Recovery from and Response to Terrorist Attacks on the United States Act, 2002	Making appropriations for the Department of Defense for the fiscal year ending September 30, 2002, and for other purposes; Department of Defense Appropriations Act, 2002; Emergency Supplemental Act, 2002; Homestake Mine Conveyance Act of 2001; USA Act; Unity in the Spirit of America Act; Department of Defense Appropriations Act, 2002	Pub. L. 107–117 (text) (PDF)
107-118	January 11, 2002	Small Business Liability Relief and Brownfields Revitalization Act	To provide certain relief for small businesses from liability under the Comprehensive Environmental Response, Compensation, and Liability Act of 1980, and to amend such Act to promote the cleanup and reuse of brownfields, to provide financial assistance for brownfields revitalization, to enhance State response programs, and for other purposes; Brownfields Revitalization and Environmental Restoration Act of 2001; Small Business Liability Protection Act; Brownfields Revitalization and Environmental Restoration bill	Pub. L. 107–118 (text) (PDF)
107-119	January 15, 2002	Office of Government Ethics Authorization Act of 2001	A bill to amend the Ethics in Government Act of 1978 (5 U.S.C. App.) to extend the authorization of appropriations for the Office of Government Ethics through fiscal year 2006	Pub. L. 107–119 (text) (PDF)
107-120	January 15, 2002	Small Business Liability Protection Act	An act to provide for the installation of a plaque to honor Dr. James Harvey Early in the Williamsburg, Kentucky Post Office Building	Pub. L. 107–120 (text) (PDF)
107-121	January 15, 2002	Native American Breast and Cervical Cancer Treatment Technical Amendment Act of 2001	A bill to amend title XIX of the Social Security Act to clarify that Indian women with breast or cervical cancer who are eligible for health services provided under a medical care program of the Indian Health Service or of a tribal organization are included in the optional medicaid eligibility category of breast or cervical cancer patients added by the Breast and Cervical Prevention and Treatment Act of 2000	Pub. L. 107–121 (text) (PDF)
107-122	January 15, 2002	Higher Education Relief Opportunities for Students Act of 2001	A bill to provide the Secretary of Education with specific waiver authority to respond to conditions in the national emergency declared by the President on September 14, 2001	Pub. L. 107–122 (text) (PDF)
107-123	January 16, 2002	Investor and Capital Markets Fee Relief Act	To amend the Securities Exchange Act of 1934 to reduce fees collected by the Securities and Exchange Commission, and for other purposes	Pub. L. 107–123 (text) (PDF)
107-124	January 16, 2002	(No short title)	An act to provide for work authorization for nonimmigrant spouses of treaty traders and treaty investors	Pub. L. 107–124 (text) (PDF)
107-125	January 16, 2002	(No short title)	An act to provide for work authorization for nonimmigrant spouses of intracompany transferees, and to reduce the period of time during which certain intracompany transferees have to be continuously employed before applying for admission to the United States	Pub. L. 107–125 (text) (PDF)
107-126	January 16, 2002	(No short title)	An act to extend for 4 years, through December 31, 2005, the authority to redact financial disclosure statements of judicial employees and judicial officers	Pub. L. 107–126 (text) (PDF)
107-127	January 16, 2002	General Shelton Congressional Gold Medal Act	To authorize the President to award a gold medal on behalf of the Congress to General Henry H. Shelton and to provide for the production of bronze duplicates of such medal for sale to the public	Pub. L. 107–127 (text) (PDF)
107-128	January 16, 2002	Basic Pilot Extension Act of 2001	To extend the "Basic Pilot" employment verification system, and for other purposes; To extend the basic pilot program for employment eligibility verification, and for other purposes	Pub. L. 107–128 (text) (PDF)
107-129	January 16, 2002	(No short title)	An act to designate the facility of the United States Postal Service located at 65 North Main Street in Cranbury, New Jersey, as the "Todd Beamer Post Office Building"	Pub. L. 107–129 (text) (PDF)
107-130	January 16, 2002	(No short title)	An act to designate the Richard J. Guadagno Headquarters and Visitors Center at Humboldt Bay National Wildlife Refuge, California	Pub. L. 107–130 (text) (PDF)
107-131	January 16, 2002	(No short title)	An act to amend the Internal Revenue Code of 1986 to simplify the reporting requirements relating to higher education tuition and related expenses	Pub. L. 107–131 (text) (PDF)
107-132	January 16, 2002	(No short title)	An act to designate the National Foreign Affairs Training Center as the George P. Shultz National Foreign Affairs Training Center	Pub. L. 107–132 (text) (PDF)
107-133	January 17, 2002	Promoting Safe and Stable Families Amendments of 2001	To extend and amend the program entitled Promoting Safe and Stable Families under title IV-B, subpart 2 of the Social Security Act, and to provide new authority to support programs for mentoring children of incarcerated parents; to amend the Foster Care Independent Living program under title IV-E of that Act to provide for educational and training vouchers for youths aging out of foster care, and for other purposes	Pub. L. 107–133 (text) (PDF)
107-134	January 23, 2002	Victims of Terrorism Tax Relief Act of 2001	An act to amend the Internal Revenue Code of 1986 to provide tax relief for victims of the terrorist attacks against the United States, and for other purposes; To amend the Internal Revenue Code of 1986 to provide tax relief for victims of the terrorist attacks against the United States on September 11, 2001; Victims of Terrorism Relief Act of 2001; Tax Relief for Victims bill	Pub. L. 107–134 (text) (PDF)
107-135	January 23, 2002	Department of Veterans Affairs Health Care Programs Enhancement Act of 2001	To amend title 38, United States Code, to enhance the authority of the Secretary of Veterans Affairs to recruit and retain qualified nurses for the Veterans Health Administration, to provide an additional basis for establishing the inability of veterans to defray expenses of necessary medical care, to enhance certain health care programs of the Department of Veterans Affairs, and for other purposes	Pub. L. 107–135 (text) (PDF)
107-136	January 24, 2002	Victims of Terrorism Relief Act of 2001	An act to name the national cemetery in Saratoga, New York, as the Gerald B.H. Solomon Saratoga National Cemetery, and for other purposes	Pub. L. 107–136 (text) (PDF)
107-137	February 6, 2002	(No short title)	An act to authorize the Secretary of the Interior to establish the Ronald Reagan Boyhood Home National Historic Site, and for other purposes	Pub. L. 107–137 (text) (PDF)
107-138	February 6, 2002	(No short title)	An act to require the valuation of nontribal interest ownership of subsurface rights within the boundaries of the Acoma Indian Reservation, and for other purposes	Pub. L. 107–138 (text) (PDF)
107-139	February 8, 2002	(No short title)	An act to amend the Higher Education Act of 1965 to establish fixed interest rates for student and parent borrowers, to extend current law with respect to special allowances for lenders, and for other purposes	Pub. L. 107–139 (text) (PDF)
107-140	February 8, 2002	(No short title)	An act to amend title 18 of the United States Code to correct a technical error in the codification of title 36 of the United States Code	Pub. L. 107–140 (text) (PDF)
107-141	February 12, 2002	Asian Elephant Conservation Reauthorization Act of 2001	To reauthorize the Asian Elephant Conservation Act of 1997	Pub. L. 107–141 (text) (PDF)
107-142	February 12, 2002	Pacific Northwest Feasibility Studies Act of 2002	To authorize the Secretary of the Interior to engage in certain feasibility studies of water resource projects in the State of Washington; Pacific Northwest Feasibility Studies Act of 2001	Pub. L. 107–142 (text) (PDF)
107-143	February 14, 2002	Pacific Northwest Feasibility Studies Act of 2001	Recognizing the 91st birthday of Ronald Reagan	Pub. L. 107–143 (text) (PDF)
107-144	February 14, 2002	(No short title)	An act to designate the facility of the United States Postal Service located at 811 South Main Street in Yerington, Nevada, as the "Joseph E. Dini, Jr. Post Office"	Pub. L. 107–144 (text) (PDF)
107-145	February 14, 2002	(No short title)	An act to designate the facility of the United States Postal Service located at 39 Tremont Street, Paris Hill, Maine, as the Horatio King Post Office Building	Pub. L. 107–145 (text) (PDF)
107-146	February 14, 2002	(No short title)	An act to designate the United States Post Office located at 60 Third Avenue in Long Branch, New Jersey, as the "Pat King Post Office Building"	Pub. L. 107–146 (text) (PDF)
107-147	March 9, 2002	Job Creation and Worker Assistance Act of 2002	To provide tax incentives for economic recovery; Economic Recovery and Assistance for American Workers Act of 2001; Economic Security and Recovery Act of 2001; Temporary Extended Unemployment Compensation Act of 2002; Temporary Unemployment Compensation Act of 2001; Victims of Terrorism Tax Relief Act of 2001; Economic Security and Recovery bill; Economic Stimulus bill; Extended Unemployment Compensation bill	Pub. L. 107–147 (text) (PDF)
107-148	March 11, 2002	Radio Free Afghanistan Act	To authorize the establishment of Radio Free Afghanistan; Radio Free Afghanistan Act of 2001	Pub. L. 107–148 (text) (PDF)
107-149	March 12, 2002	Appalachian Regional Development Act Amendments of 2002	A bill to reauthorize the Appalachian Regional Development Act of 1965, and for other purposes; Appalachian Regional Development Act Amendments of 2001	Pub. L. 107–149 (text) (PDF)
107-150	March 13, 2002	Family Sponsor Immigration Act of 2002	To amend the Immigration and Nationality Act to provide for the acceptance of an affidavit of support from another eligible sponsor if the original sponsor has died and the Attorney General has determined for humanitarian reasons that the original sponsor's classification petition should not be revoked; Family Sponsor Immigration Act of 2001	Pub. L. 107–150 (text) (PDF)
107-151	March 13, 2002	Family Sponsor Immigration Act of 2001	An act to revise certain grants for continuum of care assistance for homeless individual and families	Pub. L. 107–151 (text) (PDF)
107-152	March 14, 2002	(No short title)	Joint resolution congratulating the United States Military Academy at West Point on its bicentennial anniversary, and commending its outstanding contributions to the Nation	Pub. L. 107–152 (text) (PDF)
107-153	March 19, 2002	(No short title)	An act to Encourage the Negotiated Settlement of Tribal Claims	Pub. L. 107–153 (text) (PDF)
107-154	March 25, 2002	(No short title)	An act to extend the period of availability of unemployment assistance under the Robert T. Stafford Disaster Relief and Emergency Assistance Act in the case of victims of the terrorist attacks of September 11, 2001	Pub. L. 107–154 (text) (PDF)
107-155	March 27, 2002	Bipartisan Campaign Reform Act of 2002	To amend the Federal Election Campaign Act of 1971 to provide bipartisan campaign reform; Bipartisan Campaign Reform Act of 2001; Bipartisan Campaign Finance Reform bill; Campaign Finance Reform bill	Pub. L. 107–155 (text) (PDF)
107-156	March 31, 2002	Bipartisan Campaign Reform Act of 2001	An act to extend the authority of the Export-Import Bank until April 30, 2002	Pub. L. 107–156 (text) (PDF)
107-157	April 4, 2002	District of Columbia College Access Improvement Act of 2002	An act to amend the District of Columbia College Access Act of 1999 to permit individuals who enroll in an institution of higher education more than 3 years after graduating from a secondary school and individuals who attend private historically black colleges and universities nationwide to participate in the tuition assistance programs under such Act, and for other purposes; To amend the District of Columbia College Access Act of 1999 to permit individuals who graduated from a secondary school prior to 1998 and individuals who enroll in an institution of higher education more than 3 years after graduating from a secondary school to participate in the tuition assistance programs under such Act, and for other purposes; District of Columbia College Access Act Technical Corrections Act of 2001; District of Columbia College Access Improvement Act of 2001	Pub. L. 107–157 (text) (PDF)
107-158	April 4, 2002	District of Columbia College Access Improvement Act of 2001	An Act to amend Public Law 107–10 to authorize a United States plan to endorse and obtain observer status for Taiwan at the annual summit of the World Health Assembly in May 2002 in Geneva, Switzerland, and for other purposes.	Pub. L. 107–158 (text) (PDF)
107-159	April 4, 2002	(No short title)	An act to amend the Act entitled "An Act to authorize the leasing of restricted Indian lands for public, religious, educational, recreational, residential, business, and other purposes requiring the grant of long-term leases", approved August 9, 1955, to provide for binding arbitration clauses in leases and contracts related to reservation lands of the Gila River Indian Community	Pub. L. 107–159 (text) (PDF)
107-160	April 18, 2002	(No short title)	An act to designate the facility of the United States Postal Service located at 3698 Inner Perimeter Road in Valdosta, Georgia, as the "Major Lyn McIntosh Post Office Building"	Pub. L. 107–160 (text) (PDF)
107-161	April 18, 2002	(No short title)	An act to designate the facility of the United States Postal Service located at 805 Glen Burnie Road in Richmond, Virginia, as the "Tom Bliley Post Office Building"	Pub. L. 107–161 (text) (PDF)
107-162	April 18, 2002	(No short title)	An act to designate the facility of the United States Postal Service located at 685 Turnberry Road in Newport News, Virginia, as the "Herbert H. Bateman Post Office Building"	Pub. L. 107–162 (text) (PDF)
107-163	April 18, 2002	(No short title)	An act to designate the facility of the United States Postal Service located at 310 South State Street in St. Ignace, Michigan, as the "Bob Davis Post Office Building"	Pub. L. 107–163 (text) (PDF)
107-164	April 18, 2002	(No short title)	An act to designate the facility of the United States Postal Service located in Harlem, Montana, as the "Francis Bardanouve United States Post Office Building"	Pub. L. 107–164 (text) (PDF)
107-165	April 18, 2002	(No short title)	An act to designate the facility of the United States Postal Service located at 3131 South Crater Road in Petersburg, Virginia, as the "Norman Sisisky Post Office Building"	Pub. L. 107–165 (text) (PDF)
107-166	April 18, 2002	(No short title)	An act to designate the facility of the United States Postal Service located at 125 Main Street in Forest City, North Carolina, as the "Vernon Tarlton Post Office Building"	Pub. L. 107–166 (text) (PDF)
107-167	April 18, 2002	(No short title)	An act to designate the facility of the United States Postal Service located at 375 Carlls Path in Deer Park, New York, as the "Raymond M. Downey Post Office Building"	Pub. L. 107–167 (text) (PDF)
107-168	May 1, 2002	(No short title)	An act to extend the authority of the Export-Import Bank until May 31, 2002	Pub. L. 107–168 (text) (PDF)
107-169	May 7, 2002	(No short title)	An act to make technical amendments to section 10 of title 9, United States Code	Pub. L. 107–169 (text) (PDF)
107-170	May 7, 2002	(No short title)	An act to extend for 8 additional months the period for which chapter 12 of title 11 of the United States Code is reenacted	Pub. L. 107–170 (text) (PDF)
107-171	May 13, 2002	Farm Security and Rural Investment Act of 2002	To provide for the continuation of agricultural programs through fiscal year 2007, and for other purposes; To provide for the continuation of agricultural programs through fiscal year 2011; Agricultural Act of 2001; Agriculture, Conservation, and Rural Enhancement Act of 2002; Animal Health Protection Act; Bear Protection Act of 2002; Congressional Hunger Fellows Act of 2001; Congressional Hunger Fellows Act of 2002; Farm Security Act of 2001; Food Stamp Reauthorization Act of 2002; National Rural Cooperative and Business Equity Fund Act; National Rural Development Partnership Act of 2002; Organic Products Promotion, Research, and Information Act of 2002; School Environment Protection Act of 2002; Farm Aid bill; Farmer Bankruptcy bill	Pub. L. 107–171 (text) (PDF)
107-172	May 14, 2002	Hematological Cancer Research Investment and Education Act of 2002	A bill to amend the Public Health Service Act to provide for research, information, and education with respect to blood cancer; Hematological Cancer Research Investment and Education Act of 2001	Pub. L. 107–172 (text) (PDF)
107-173	May 14, 2002	Enhanced Border Security and Visa Entry Reform Act of 2002	To enhance the border security of the United States, and for other purposes; Enhanced Border Security and Visa Entry Reform Act of 2001; United States Border Security bill	Pub. L. 107–173 (text) (PDF)
107-174	May 15, 2002	Notification and Federal Employee Antidiscrimination and Retaliation Act of 2002	To require that Federal agencies be accountable for violations of antidiscrimination and whistleblower protection laws, and for other purposes; Notification and Federal Employee Antidiscrimination and Retaliation Act of 2001	Pub. L. 107–174 (text) (PDF)
107-175	May 17, 2002	(No short title)	An act to designate the Federal building located in Charlotte Amalie, St. Thomas, United States Virgin Islands, as the "Ron de Lugo Federal Building"	Pub. L. 107–175 (text) (PDF)
107-176	May 17, 2002	(No short title)	An act to designate the Federal building located at 143 West Liberty Street, Medina, Ohio, as the "Donald J. Pease Federal Building"	Pub. L. 107–176 (text) (PDF)
107-177	May 17, 2002	(No short title)	An act to designate the Federal building and United States courthouse located at 501 Bell Street in Alton, Illinois, as the "William L. Beatty Federal Building and United States Courthouse"	Pub. L. 107–177 (text) (PDF)
107-178	May 17, 2002	(No short title)	An act to designate the Federal building and United States courthouse located at 400 North Main Street in Butte, Montana, as the "Mike Mansfield Federal Building and United States Courthouse"	Pub. L. 107–178 (text) (PDF)
107-179	May 20, 2002	(No short title)	An act to require a report on the operations of the State Justice Institute	Pub. L. 107–179 (text) (PDF)
107-180	May 20, 2002	Criminal Justice Coordinating Council Restructuring Act of 2002	To require certain Federal officials with responsibility for the administration of the criminal justice system of the District of Columbia to serve on and participate in the activities of the District of Columbia Criminal Justice Coordinating Council, and for other purposes; Criminal Justice Coordinating Council Restructuring Act of 2001	Pub. L. 107–180 (text) (PDF)
107-181	May 20, 2002	Clergy Housing Allowance Clarification Act of 2002	To amend the Internal Revenue Code of 1986 to clarify that the parsonage allowance exclusion is limited to the fair rental value of the property	Pub. L. 107–181 (text) (PDF)
107-182	May 21, 2002	Criminal Justice Coordinating Council Restructuring Act of 2001	An act to redesignate the Federal building located at 3348 South Kedzie Avenue, in Chicago, Illinois, as the "Paul Simon Chicago Job Corps Center"	Pub. L. 107–182 (text) (PDF)
107-183	May 29, 2002	(No short title)	An act to name the chapel located in the national cemetery in Los Angeles, California, as the "Bob Hope Veterans Chapel"	Pub. L. 107–183 (text) (PDF)
107-184	May 29, 2002	(No short title)	An act to name the Department of Veterans Affairs Medical and Regional Office Center in Wichita, Kansas, as the 'Robert J. Dole Department of Veterans Affairs Medical and Regional Office Center'	Pub. L. 107–184 (text) (PDF)
107-185	May 30, 2002	(No short title)	An act to extend eligibility for refugee status of unmarried sons and daughters of certain Vietnamese refugees	Pub. L. 107–185 (text) (PDF)
107-186	May 30, 2002	(No short title)	An act to extend the authority of the Export-Import Bank until June 14, 2002	Pub. L. 107–186 (text) (PDF)
107-187	June 10, 2002	Gerald B. H. Solomon Freedom Consolidation Act of 2001	To endorse the vision of further enlargement of the NATO Alliance articulated by President George W. Bush on June 15, 2001, and by former President William J. Clinton on October 22, 1996, and for other purposes; Freedom Consolidation Act of 2001	Pub. L. 107–187 (text) (PDF)
107-188	June 12, 2002	Public Health Security and Bioterrorism Preparedness and Response Act of 2002	To improve the ability of the United States to prevent, prepare for, and respond to bioterrorism and other public health emergencies; Agricultural Bioterrorism Protection Act of 2002; Bioterrorism Preparedness Act of 2001; Community Access to Emergency Defibrillation Act of 2002; Prescription Drug User Fee Amendments of 2002; Public Health Security and Bioterrorism Preparedness and Response Act of 2001; Public Health Security and Bioterrorism Response Act of 2001; Biological Chemical Attack bill; Bioterrorism Preparedness bill	Pub. L. 107–188 (text) (PDF)
107-189	June 14, 2002	Export-Import Bank Reauthorization Act of 2002	A bill to reauthorize the Export-Import Bank of the United States; Export-Import Bank Reauthorization Act of 2001	Pub. L. 107–189 (text) (PDF)
107-190	June 18, 2002	Export-Import Bank Reauthorization Act of 2001	An act to designate the United States Post Office building located at 3101 West Sunflower Avenue in Santa Ana, California, as the "Hector G. Godinez Post Office Building"	Pub. L. 107–190 (text) (PDF)
107-191	June 18, 2002	(No short title)	An act to designate the facility of the United States Postal Service located at 600 Calumet Street in Lake Linden, Michigan, as the "Philip E. Ruppe Post Office Building"	Pub. L. 107–191 (text) (PDF)
107-192	June 18, 2002	(No short title)	An act to designate the facility of the United States Postal Service located at 2829 Commercial Way in Rock Springs, Wyoming, as the "Teno Roncalio Post Office Building"	Pub. L. 107–192 (text) (PDF)
107-193	June 18, 2002	(No short title)	An act to designate the facility of the United States Postal Service located at 3719 Highway 4 in Jay, Florida, as the "Joseph W. Westmoreland Post Office Building"	Pub. L. 107–193 (text) (PDF)
107-194	June 18, 2002	(No short title)	An act to designate the facility of the United States Postal Service located at 1590 East Joyce Boulevard in Fayetteville, Arkansas, as the "Clarence B. Craft Post Office Building"	Pub. L. 107–194 (text) (PDF)
107-195	June 19, 2002	Auction Reform Act of 2002	To eliminate the deadlines for spectrum auctions of spectrum previously allocated to television broadcasting	Pub. L. 107–195 (text) (PDF)
107-196	June 24, 2002	Mychal Judge Police and Fire Chaplains Public Safety Officers' Benefit Act of 2002	A bill to amend the Omnibus Crime Control and Safe Streets Act of 1968 to ensure that chaplains killed in the line of duty receive public safety officer death benefits	Pub. L. 107–196 (text) (PDF)
107-197	June 25, 2002	Terrorist Bombings Convention Implementation Act of 2002	An act to implement the International Convention for the Suppression of Terrorist Bombings to strengthen criminal laws relating to attacks on places of public use, to implement the International Convention of the Suppression of the Financing of Terrorism, to combat terrorism and defend the Nation against terrorist acts, and for other purposes	Pub. L. 107–197 (text) (PDF)
107-198	June 28, 2002	Small Business Paperwork Relief Act of 2002	A bill to amend chapter 35 of title 44, United States Code, for the purpose of facilitating compliance by small business concerns with certain Federal paperwork requirements, to establish a task force to examine information collection and dissemination, and for other purposes; To amend chapter 35 of title 44, United States Code, for the purpose of facilitating compliance by small businesses with certain Federal paperwork requirements and to establish a task force to examine the feasibility of streamlining paperwork requirements applicable to small businesses; Small Business Paperwork Relief Act	Pub. L. 107–198 (text) (PDF)
107-199	June 28, 2002	(No short title)	An act to amend title 31 of the United States Code to increase the public debt limit	Pub. L. 107–199 (text) (PDF)
107-200	July 23, 2002	Yucca Mountain Development resolution	Approving the site at Yucca Mountain, Nevada, for the development of a repository for the disposal of high-level radioactive waste and spent nuclear fuel, pursuant to the Nuclear Waste Policy Act of 1982	Pub. L. 107–200 (text) (PDF)
107-201	July 23, 2002	Support of American Eagle Silver Bullion Program Act	A bill to authorize the Secretary of the Treasury to purchase silver on the open market when the silver stockpile is depleted, to be used to mint coins	Pub. L. 107–201 (text) (PDF)
107-202	July 24, 2002	Benjamin Franklin Tercentenary Commission Act	To establish the Benjamin Franklin Tercentenary Commission	Pub. L. 107–202 (text) (PDF)
107-203	July 24, 2002	(No short title)	An act to provide for an independent investigation of Forest Service firefighter deaths that are caused by wildfire entrapment or burnover	Pub. L. 107–203 (text) (PDF)
107-204	July 30, 2002	Sarbanes-Oxley Act of 2002	To protect investors by improving the accuracy and reliability of corporate disclosures made pursuant to the securities laws, and for other purposes; Corporate Fraud Accountability Act of 2002; Corporate and Auditing Accountability, Responsibility, and Transparency Act of 2002; Corporate and Criminal Fraud Accountability Act of 2002; Public Company Accounting Reform and Investor Protection Act of 2002; White-Collar Crime Penalty Enhancement Act of 2002; Accounting Industry Reform bill; Corporate Accountability bill	Pub. L. 107–204 (text) (PDF)
107-205	August 1, 2002	Nurse Reinvestment Act	To amend the Public Health Service Act with respect to health professions programs regarding the field of nursing	Pub. L. 107–205 (text) (PDF)
107-206	August 2, 2002	American Service-Members' Protection Act		Pub. L. 107–206 (text) (PDF)
107-207	August 5, 2002	Born-Alive Infants Protection Act of 2002	To protect infants who are born alive; Born-Alive Infants Protection Act of 2001; Partial Birth Abortion bill; Protect Infants Born Alive bill	Pub. L. 107–207 (text) (PDF)
107-208	August 6, 2002	Child Status Protection Act	To amend the Immigration and Nationality Act to determine whether an alien is a child, for purposes of classification as an immediate relative, based on the age of the alien on the date the classification petition with respect to the alien is filed, and for other purposes; Child Status Protection Act of 2001	Pub. L. 107–208 (text) (PDF)
107-209	August 6, 2002	Child Status Protection Act of 2001	Joint resolution conferring honorary citizenship of the United States posthumously on Marie Joseph Paul Yves Roche Gilbert du Motier, the Marquis de Lafayette	Pub. L. 107–209 (text) (PDF)
107-210	August 6, 2002	Trade Act of 2002	To extend the Andean Trade Preference Act, to grant additional trade benefits under that Act, and for other purposes; Andean Trade Preference Expansion Act; Andean Trade Promotion and Drug Eradication Act; Bipartisan Trade Promotion Authority Act of 2002; Customs Border Security Act of 2002; Trade Adjustment Assistance Reform Act of 2002; Wool Manufacturer Payment Clarification and Technical Corrections Act; Fast Track Trade Authority bill; Import Competition bill	Pub. L. 107–210 (text) (PDF)
107-211	August 21, 2002	Wool Manufacturer Payment Clarification and Technical Corrections Act	An act to amend the Clear Creek County, Colorado, Public Lands Transfer Act of 1993 to provide additional time for Clear Creek County to dispose of certain lands transferred to the county under the Act	Pub. L. 107–211 (text) (PDF)
107-212	August 21, 2002	Guam Foreign Investment Equity Act	To provide for the determination of withholding tax rates under the Guam income tax	Pub. L. 107–212 (text) (PDF)
107-213	August 21, 2002	(No short title)	An act to redesignate certain lands within the Craters of the Moon National Monument, and for other purposes	Pub. L. 107–213 (text) (PDF)
107-214	August 21, 2002	Long Walk National Historic Trail Study Act	To amend the National Trails System Act to designate the Navajo Long Walk to Bosque Redondo as a national historic trail; To amend the National Trails System Act to designate the route in Arizona and New Mexico which the Navajo and Mescalero Apache Indian tribes were forced to walk in 1863 and 1864, for study for potential addition to the National Trails System; Navajo Long Walk National Historic Trail Act	Pub. L. 107–214 (text) (PDF)
107-215	August 21, 2002	Booker T. Washington National Monument Boundary Adjustment Act of 2002	To expand the boundary of the Booker T. Washington National Monument, and for other purposes; Booker T. Washington National Monument Boundary Adjustment Act of 2001	Pub. L. 107–215 (text) (PDF)
107-216	August 21, 2002	James Peak Wilderness and Protection Area Act	To designate the James Peak Wilderness and Protection Area in the Arapaho and Roosevelt National Forests in the State of Colorado, and for other purposes; James Peak Wilderness, Wilderness Study, and Protection Area Act	Pub. L. 107–216 (text) (PDF)
107-217	August 21, 2002	James Peak Wilderness, Wilderness Study, and Protection Area Act	An act to revise, codify, and enact without substantive change certain general and permanent laws, related to public buildings, property, and works, as title 40, United States Code, "Public Buildings, Property, and Works"	Pub. L. 107–217 (text) (PDF)
107-218	August 21, 2002	Tumacacori National Historical Park Boundary Revision Act of 2002	To revise the boundary of the Tumacácori National Historical Park in the State of Arizona; Tumacacori National Historical Park Boundary Revision Act of 2001	Pub. L. 107–218 (text) (PDF)
107-219	August 21, 2002	Tumacacori National Historical Park Boundary Revision Act of 2001	An act to rename Wolf Trap Farm Park as "Wolf Trap National Park for the Performing Arts" and for other purposes	Pub. L. 107–219 (text) (PDF)
107-220	August 21, 2002	(No short title)	An act to amend the Public Health Service Act to redesignate a facility as the National Hansen's Disease Programs Center, and for other purposes	Pub. L. 107–220 (text) (PDF)
107-221	August 21, 2002	Fort Clatsop National Memorial Expansion Act of 2002	To authorize the acquisition of additional lands for inclusion in the Fort Clatsop National Memorial in the State of Oregon, and for other purposes; Fort Clatsop National Memorial Expansion Act of 2001	Pub. L. 107–221 (text) (PDF)
107-222	August 21, 2002	Fort Clatsop National Memorial Expansion Act of 2001	An act to amend title X of the Energy Policy Act of 1992, and for other purposes	Pub. L. 107–222 (text) (PDF)
107-223	August 21, 2002	(No short title)	An act to authorize the Secretary of the Interior to issue right-of-way permits for natural gas pipelines within the boundary of Great Smoky Mountains National Park	Pub. L. 107–223 (text) (PDF)
107-224	September 18, 2002	John F. Kennedy Center Plaza Authorization Act of 2002	A bill to amend the John F. Kennedy Center Act to authorize the Secretary of Transportation to carry out a project for construction of a plaza adjacent to the John F. Kennedy Center for the Performing Arts, and for other purposes	Pub. L. 107–224 (text) (PDF)
107-225	September 24, 2002	(No short title)	An act to redesignate the facility of the United States Postal Service located at 900 Brentwood Road, NE, in Washington, D.C., as the "Joseph Curseen, Jr. and Thomas Morris, Jr. Processing and Distribution Center"	Pub. L. 107–225 (text) (PDF)
107-226	September 24, 2002	Flight 93 National Memorial Act	To authorize a national memorial to commemorate the passengers and crew of Flight 93 who, on September 11, 2001, courageously gave their lives thereby thwarting a planned attack on our Nation's Capital, and for other purposes; Flight 93 National Memorial Act	Pub. L. 107–226 (text) (PDF)
107-227	September 24, 2002	(No short title)	An act to designate the facility of the United States Postal Service located at 6101 West Old Shakopee Road in Bloomington, Minnesota, as the "Thomas E. Burnett, Jr. Post Office Building"	Pub. L. 107–227 (text) (PDF)
107-228	September 30, 2002	Foreign Relations Authorization Act, Fiscal Year 2003	To authorize appropriations for the Department of State for fiscal years 2002 and 2003, and for other purposes; American Servicemembers' Protection Act; Clean Water for the Americas Partnership Act of 2002; Department of State Authorization Act, Fiscal Year 2003; East Timor Transition to Independence Act of 2001; East Timor Transition to Independence Act of 2002; Foreign Relations Authorization Act, Fiscal Years 2002 and 2003; Freedom Investment Act of 2001; Freedom Investment Act of 2002; Global Democracy Promotion Act of 2001; Iran Nuclear Proliferation Prevention Act of 2001; Iran Nuclear Proliferation Prevention Act of 2002; Middle East Peace Commitments Act of 2002; Nonproliferation Assistance Coordination Act of 2002; Russian Federation Debt Reduction for Nonproliferation Act of 2002; Security Assistance Act of 2001; Security Assistance Act of 2002; Tibetan Policy Act of 2002; State Department FY2000-2003 Authorizations bill	Pub. L. 107–228 (text) (PDF)
107-229	September 30, 2002	(No short title)	Making continuing appropriations for the fiscal year 2003, and for other purposes	Pub. L. 107–229 (text) (PDF)
107-230	October 1, 2002	(No short title)	An act to provide a temporary waiver from certain transportation conformity requirements and metropolitan transportation planning requirements under the Clean Air Act and under other laws for certain areas in New York where the planning offices and resources have been destroyed by acts of terrorism, and for other purposes	Pub. L. 107–230 (text) (PDF)
107-231	October 1, 2002	National Construction Safety Team Act	To provide for the establishment of investigative teams to assess building performance and emergency response and evacuation procedures in the wake of any building failure that has resulted in substantial loss of life or that posed significant potential of substantial loss of life	Pub. L. 107–231 (text) (PDF)
107-232	October 1, 2002	(No short title)	An act to amend section 5307 of title 49, United States Code, to allow transit systems in urbanized areas that, for the first time, exceeded 200,000 in population according to the 2000 census to retain flexibility in the use of Federal transit formula grants in fiscal year 2003, and for other purposes	Pub. L. 107–232 (text) (PDF)
107-233	October 1, 2002	(No short title)	An act to amend the Communications Satellite Act of 1962 to extend the deadline for the Intelsat initial public offering	Pub. L. 107–233 (text) (PDF)
107-234	October 4, 2002	(No short title)	An act to extend the Irish Peace Process Cultural and Training Program	Pub. L. 107–234 (text) (PDF)
107-235	October 4, 2002	(No short title)	Making further continuing appropriations for the fiscal year 2003, and for other purposes	Pub. L. 107–235 (text) (PDF)
107-236	October 9, 2002	Santa Monica Mountains National Recreation Area Boundary Adjustment Act	To adjust the boundaries of Santa Monica Mountains National Recreation Area, and for other purposes	Pub. L. 107–236 (text) (PDF)
107-237	October 11, 2002	Burnt, Malheur, Owyhee, and Powder River Basin Water Optimization Feasibility Study Act of 2001	A bill to authorize the Secretary of the Interior to conduct feasibility studies on water optimization in the Burnt River basin, Malheur River basin, Owyhee River basin, and Powder River Basin, Oregon	Pub. L. 107–237 (text) (PDF)
107-238	October 11, 2002	Vicksburg National Military Park Boundary Modification Act of 2002	A bill to modify the boundary of Vicksburg National Military Park to include the property known as Pemberton's Headquarters, and for other purposes; Vicksburg National Military Park Boundary Modification Act of 2001	Pub. L. 107–238 (text) (PDF)
107-239	October 11, 2002	(No short title)	An act to ratify an agreement between The Aleut Corporation and the United States of America to exchange land rights received under the Alaska Native Claims Settlement Act for certain land interests on Adak Island, and for other purposes	Pub. L. 107–239 (text) (PDF)
107-240	October 11, 2002	(No short title)	Making further continuing appropriations for the fiscal year 2003, and for other purposes	Pub. L. 107–240 (text) (PDF)
107-241	October 16, 2002	(No short title)	An act to amend the charter of the AMVETS organization	Pub. L. 107–241 (text) (PDF)
107-242	October 16, 2002	(No short title)	An act to amend the charter of the Veterans of Foreign Wars of the United States organization to make members of the armed forces who receive special pay for duty subject to hostile fire or imminent danger eligible for membership in the organization, and for other purposes	Pub. L. 107–242 (text) (PDF)
107-243	October 16, 2002	Authorization for Use of Military Force Against Iraq Resolution of 2002	To authorize the use of United States Armed Forces against Iraq; Authorization for the Use of Military Force Against Iraq; Iraq resolution	Pub. L. 107–243 (text) (PDF)
107-244	October 18, 2002	(No short title)	Making further continuing appropriations for the fiscal year 2003, and for other purposes	Pub. L. 107–244 (text) (PDF)
107-245	October 21, 2002	Sudan Peace Act	To facilitate famine relief efforts and a comprehensive solution to the war in Sudan	Pub. L. 107–245 (text) (PDF)
107-246	October 23, 2002	Russian Democracy Act of 2002	An Act to make available funds under the Foreign Assistance Act of 1961 to expand democracy, good governance, and anti-corruption programs in the Russian Federation in order to promote and strengthen democratic government and civil society and independent media in that country; To make available funds under the Foreign Assistance Act of 1961 to expand democracy, good governance, and anti-corruption programs in the Russian Federation in order to promote and strengthen democratic government and civil society in that country and to support independent media; Russian Democracy Act of 2001	Pub. L. 107–246 (text) (PDF)
107-247	October 23, 2002	Veterans' Compensation Cost-of-Living Adjustment Act of 2002	An act to increase, effective as of December 1, 2002, the rates of compensation for veterans with service-connected disabilities and the rates of dependency and indemnity compensation for the survivors of certain disabled veterans; To amend title 38, United States Code, to provide a cost-of-living increase in the rates of compensation for veterans with service-connected disability and dependency and indemnity compensation for surviving spouses of such veterans, to expand certain benefits for veterans and their survivors, and for other purposes; To increase, effective as of December 1, 2002, the rates of disability compensation for veterans with service-connected disabilities and the rates of dependency and indemnity compensation for survivors of certain service-connected disabled veterans, and for other purposes; Veterans' and Survivors' Benefits Expansion Act of 2002; Veterans' Benefits bill	Pub. L. 107–247 (text) (PDF)
107-248	October 23, 2002	Department of Defense Appropriations Act, 2003	Making appropriations for the Department of Defense for the fiscal year ending September 30, 2003, and for other purposes; Commercial Reusable In-Space Transportation Act of 2002; Commercial Reusable In-Space Transportation Act of 2002; Department of Defense Appropriations, FY2003 bill	Pub. L. 107–248 (text) (PDF)
107-249	October 23, 2002	Military Construction Appropriations Act, 2003	Making appropriations for military construction, family housing, and base realignment and closure for the Department of Defense for the fiscal year ending September 30, 2003, and for other purposes; Military Construction Appropriations, FY2003 bill	Pub. L. 107–249 (text) (PDF)
107-250	October 26, 2002	Medical Device User Fee and Modernization Act of 2002	To amend the Federal Food, Drug, and Cosmetic Act to make improvements in the regulation of medical devices, and for other purposes	Pub. L. 107–250 (text) (PDF)
107-251	October 26, 2002	Health Care Safety Net Amendments of 2002	An original bill to amend the Public Health Service Act to reauthorize and strengthen the health centers program and the National Health Service Corps, and to establish the Healthy Communities Access Program, which will help coordinate services for the uninsured and underinsured, and for other purposes; Health Care Safety Net Amendments of 2001; Telehealth Grant Consolidation Act of 2001; Telehealth Grant Consolidation Act of 2002	Pub. L. 107–251 (text) (PDF)
107-252	October 29, 2002	Help America Vote Act of 2002	A bill to require States and localities to meet uniform and nondiscriminatory election technology and administration requirements applicable to Federal elections, to establish grant programs to provide assistance to States and localities to met those requirements and to improve election technology and the administration of Federal elections, to establish the Election Administration Commission, and for other purposes; To establish a program to provide funds to States to replace punch card voting systems, to establish the Election Assistance Commission to assist in the administration of Federal elections and to otherwise provide assistance with the administration of certain Federal election laws and programs, to establish minimum election administration standards for States and units of local government with responsibility for the administration of Federal elections, and for other purposes; Help America Vote Act of 2001; Martin Luther King Jr. Equal Protection of Voting Rights Act of 2002; Election Reform bill; Improve Voting Process bill	Pub. L. 107–252 (text) (PDF)
107-253	October 29, 2002	Inland Flood Forecasting and Warning System Act of 2002	To authorize the National Oceanic and Atmospheric Administration, through the United States Weather Research Program, to conduct research and development, training, and outreach activities relating to inland flood forecasting improvement, and for other purposes; To authorize the National Weather Service to conduct research and development, training, and outreach activities relating to tropical cyclone inland forecasting improvement, and for other purposes; Tropical Cyclone Inland Forecasting Improvement and Warning System Development Act of 2001	Pub. L. 107–253 (text) (PDF)
107-254	October 29, 2002	Tropical Cyclone Inland Forecasting Improvement and Warning System Development Act of 2001	An act to authorize the duration of the base contract of the Navy-Marine Corps Intranet contract to be more than five years but not more than seven years	Pub. L. 107–254 (text) (PDF)
107-255	October 29, 2002	(No short title)	Recognizing the contributions of Patsy T. Mink	Pub. L. 107–255 (text) (PDF)
107-256	October 29, 2002	Niagara Falls National Heritage Area Study Act	A bill to authorize the Secretary of the Interior to conduct a study of the suitability and feasibility of establishing the Niagara Falls National Heritage Area in the State of New York, and for other purposes	Pub. L. 107–256 (text) (PDF)
107-257	October 29, 2002	(No short title)	An act to designate the United States courthouse to be constructed at 8th Avenue and Mill Street in Eugene, Oregon, as the "Wayne Lyman Morse United States Courthouse"	Pub. L. 107–257 (text) (PDF)
107-258	October 29, 2002	Persian Gulf War POW/MIA Accountability Act of 2002	A bill to amend the Bring Them Home Alive Act of 2000 to provide an asylum program with regard to American Persian Gulf War POW/MIAs, and for other purposes; Persian Gulf POW/MIA War Accountability Act of 2001; Persian Gulf War POW/MIA Accountability Act of 2001	Pub. L. 107–258 (text) (PDF)
107-259	October 29, 2002	(No short title)	An act to identify certain routes in the States of Texas, Oklahoma, Colorado, and New Mexico as part of the Ports-to-Plains Corridor, a high priority corridor on the National Highway System	Pub. L. 107–259 (text) (PDF)
107-260	October 29, 2002	Benign Brain Tumor Cancer Registries Amendment Act	A bill to amend the Public Health Service Act to provide for the collection of data on benign brain-related tumors through the national program of cancer registries	Pub. L. 107–260 (text) (PDF)
107-261	October 30, 2002	(No short title)	An act to designate the facility of the United States Postal Service located at 127 Social Street in Woonsocket, Rhode Island, as the "Alphonse F. Auclair Post Office Building"	Pub. L. 107–261 (text) (PDF)
107-262	October 30, 2002	(No short title)	An act to designate the facility of the United States Postal Service located at 7 Commercial Street in Newport, Rhode Island, as the "Bruce F. Cotta Post Office Building"	Pub. L. 107–262 (text) (PDF)
107-263	October 30, 2002	(No short title)	An act to redesignate the facility of the United States Postal Service located at 89 River Street in Hoboken, New Jersey, as the "Frank Sinatra Post Office Building"	Pub. L. 107–263 (text) (PDF)
107-264	October 30, 2002	(No short title)	An act to designate the facility of the United States Postal Service located at 1299 North 7th Street in Philadelphia, Pennsylvania, as the "Herbert Arlene Post Office Building"	Pub. L. 107–264 (text) (PDF)
107-265	October 30, 2002	(No short title)	An act to designate the facility of the United States Postal Service located at 6150 North Broad Street in Philadelphia, Pennsylvania, as the "Rev. Leon Sullivan Post Office Building"	Pub. L. 107–265 (text) (PDF)
107-266	October 30, 2002	(No short title)	An act to designate the facility of the United States Postal Service located at 925 Dickinson Street in Philadelphia, Pennsylvania, as the "William A. Cibotti Post Office Building"	Pub. L. 107–266 (text) (PDF)
107-267	October 30, 2002	(No short title)	An act to designate the facility of the United States Postal Service located at 120 North Maine Street in Fallon, Nevada, as the "Rollan D. Melton Post Office Building"	Pub. L. 107–267 (text) (PDF)
107-268	October 30, 2002	(No short title)	An act to designate the facility of the United States Postal Service located at 1199 Pasadena Boulevard in Pasadena, Texas, as the "Jim Fonteno Post Office Building"	Pub. L. 107–268 (text) (PDF)
107-269	October 30, 2002	(No short title)	An act to designate the facility of the United States Postal Service located at 204 South Broad Street in Lancaster, Ohio, as the "Clarence Miller Post Office Building"	Pub. L. 107–269 (text) (PDF)
107-270	October 30, 2002	(No short title)	An act to designate the facility of the United States Postal Service located at 1895 Avenida Del Oro in Oceanside, California, as the "Ronald C. Packard Post Office Building"	Pub. L. 107–270 (text) (PDF)
107-271	October 30, 2002	(No short title)	An act to redesignate the facility of the United States Postal Service located at 265 South Western Avenue, Los Angeles, California, as the "Nat King Cole Post Office"	Pub. L. 107–271 (text) (PDF)
107-272	October 30, 2002	(No short title)	An act to redesignate the facility of the United States Postal Service located at 6910 South Yorktown Avenue in Tulsa, Oklahoma, as the "Robert Wayne Jenkins Station"	Pub. L. 107–272 (text) (PDF)
107-273	November 2, 2002	(No short title)	To authorize appropriations for the Department of Justice for fiscal year 2002, and for other purposes; Antitrust Modernization Commission Act of 2002; Antitrust Technical Corrections Act of 2002; Consequences for Juvenile Offenders Act of 2002; Crime-Free Rural States Act of 2002; Criminal Law Technical Amendments Act of 2001; Criminal Law Technical Amendments Act of 2002; Drug Abuse Education, Prevention, and Treatment Act of 2001; Drug Abuse Education, Prevention, and Treatment Act of 2002; Ecstasy Prevention Act of 2001; Federal Judiciary Protection Act of 2002; Incentive Grants for Local Delinquency Prevention Programs Act of 2002; Intellectual Property and High Technology Technical Amendments Act of 2002; James Guelff and Chris McCurley Body Armor Act of 2002; Judicial Improvements Act of 2002; Juvenile Justice and Delinquency Prevention Act of 2002; Law Enforcement Tribute Act; Madrid Protocol Implementation Act; Multiparty, Multiforum Trial Jurisdiction Act of 2002; National Comprehensive Crime-Free Communities Act; Offender Reentry and Community Safety Act of 2001; Patent and Trademark Office Authorization Act of 2002; Posthumous Citizenship Restoration Act of 2002; Technology, Education and Copyright Harmonization Act of 2002; Violence Against Women Office Act; Department of Justice, FY2002 Authorization bill	Pub. L. 107–273 (text) (PDF)
107-274	November 2, 2002	Border Commuter Student Act of 2002	To establish new nonimmigrant classes for border commuter students	Pub. L. 107–274 (text) (PDF)
107-275	November 2, 2002	Black Lung Consolidation of Administrative Responsibility Act	To consolidate all black lung benefit responsibility under a single official, and for other purposes	Pub. L. 107–275 (text) (PDF)
107-276	November 2, 2002	Violence Against Women Office Act	An act to amend section 527 of the Internal Revenue Code of 1986 to eliminate notification and return requirements for State and local party committees and candidate committees and avoid duplicate reporting by certain State and local political committees of information required to be reported and made publicly available under State law, and for other purposes	Pub. L. 107–276 (text) (PDF)
107-277	November 5, 2002	Enterprise Integration Act of 2002	To authorize the National Institute of Standards and Technology to work with major manufacturing industries on an initiative of standards development and implementation for electronic enterprise integration; Enterprise Integration Act of 2001	Pub. L. 107–277 (text) (PDF)
107-278	November 5, 2002	Enterprise Integration Act of 2001	An act to amend the International Organizations Immunities Act to provide for the applicability of that Act to the European Central Bank	Pub. L. 107–278 (text) (PDF)
107-279	November 5, 2002	Regional Educational Technical Assistance Act	An act to provide for improvement of Federal education research, statistics, evaluation, information, and dissemination, and for other purposes	Pub. L. 107–279 (text) (PDF)
107-280	November 6, 2002	Rare Diseases Act of 2002	To amend the Public Health Service Act to establish an Office of Rare Diseases at the National Institutes of Health, and for other purposes	Pub. L. 107–280 (text) (PDF)
107-281	November 6, 2002	Rare Diseases Orphan Product Development Act of 2002	To amend the Federal Food, Drug, and Cosmetic Act with respect to the development of products for rare diseases	Pub. L. 107–281 (text) (PDF)
107-282	November 6, 2002	Clark County Conservation of Public Land and Natural Resources Act of 2002	To establish wilderness areas, promote conservation, improve public land, and provide for high quality development in Clark County, Nevada, and for other purposes; Humboldt Project Conveyance Act; Red Rock Canyon National Conservation Area Protection and Enhancement Act of 2002; Sloan Canyon National Conservation Area Act	Pub. L. 107–282 (text) (PDF)
107-283	November 6, 2002	Sloan Canyon National Conservation Area Act	An act to designate the facility of the United States Postal Service located at 301 South Howes Street in Fort Collins, Colorado, as the "Barney Apodaca Post Office"	Pub. L. 107–283 (text) (PDF)
107-284	November 6, 2002	(No short title)	An act to designate the facility of the United States Postal Service located at 4 East Central Street in Worcester, Massachusetts, as the "Joseph D. Early Post Office Building"	Pub. L. 107–284 (text) (PDF)
107-285	November 6, 2002	(No short title)	An act to designate the facility of the United States Postal Service located at 380 Main Street in Farmingdale, New York, as the "Peter J. Ganci, Jr. Post Office Building"	Pub. L. 107–285 (text) (PDF)
107-286	November 6, 2002	(No short title)	An act to designate the facility of the United States Postal Service located at 5805 White Oak Avenue in Encino, California, as the "Francis Dayle 'Chick' Hearn Post Office"	Pub. L. 107–286 (text) (PDF)
107-287	November 7, 2002	Department of Veterans Affairs Emergency Preparedness Act of 2002	A bill to amend title 38, United States Code, to enhance the emergency preparedness of the Department of Veterans Affairs, and for other purposes; To amend title 38, United States Code, to provide for the establishment of emergency medical preparedness centers in the Department of Veterans Affairs; To amend title 38, United States Code, to provide for the establishment within the Department of Veterans Affairs of improved emergency medical preparedness, research, and education programs to combat terrorism, and for other purposes; Department of Veterans Affairs Emergency Preparedness Research, Education, and Bio-Terrorism Prevention Act of 2002; National Medical Emergency Preparedness Act of 2001	Pub. L. 107–287 (text) (PDF)
107-288	November 7, 2002	Jobs for Veterans Act	To amend title 38, United States Code, to revise and improve employment, training, and placement services furnished to veterans, and for other purposes	Pub. L. 107–288 (text) (PDF)
107-289	November 7, 2002	Accountability of Tax Dollars Act of 2002	To amend title 31, United States Code, to expand the types of Federal agencies that are required to prepare audited financial statements	Pub. L. 107–289 (text) (PDF)
107-290	November 7, 2002	National Medical Emergency Preparedness Act of 2001	An act to amend the District of Columbia Retirement Protection Act of 1997 to permit the Secretary of the Treasury to use estimated amounts in determining the service longevity component of the Federal benefit payment required to be paid under such Act to certain retirees of the Metropolitan Police Department of the District of Columbia	Pub. L. 107–290 (text) (PDF)
107-291	November 7, 2002	(No short title)	An act to designate the facility of the United States Postal Service located at 206 South Main Street in Glennville, Georgia, as the "Michael Lee Woodcock Post Office"	Pub. L. 107–291 (text) (PDF)
107-292	November 13, 2002	Native American Housing Assistance and Self-Determination Reauthorization Act of 2002	A bill to reauthorize the Native American Housing Assistance and Self-Determination Act of 1996; Native American Housing Assistance and Self-Determination Reauthorization Act of 2001	Pub. L. 107–292 (text) (PDF)
107-293	November 13, 2002	Native American Housing Assistance and Self-Determination Reauthorization Act of 2001	An act to reaffirm the reference to one Nation under God in the Pledge of Allegiance	Pub. L. 107–293 (text) (PDF)
107-294	November 23, 2002	(No short title)	Making further continuing appropriations for the fiscal year 2003, and for other purposes	Pub. L. 107–294 (text) (PDF)
107-295	November 25, 2002	Maritime Transportation Security Act of 2002	A bill to amend the Merchant Marine Act, 1936, to establish a program to ensure greater security for United States seaports, and for other purposes; Coast Guard Authorization Act for Fiscal Year 2002; Coast Guard Authorization Act for Fiscal Year 2003; Coast Guard Personnel and Maritime Safety Act of 2002; Maritime Policy Improvement Act of 2002; Maritime Transportation Antiterrorism Act of 2002; Omnibus Maritime and Coast Guard Improvements Act of 2002; Port and Maritime Security Act of 2001; Port and Maritime Security Appropriations Authorization bill; Port and Maritime Security bill	Pub. L. 107–295 (text) (PDF)
107-296	November 25, 2002	Homeland Security Act of 2002	To establish the Department of Homeland Security, and for other purposes; Homeland Security Act of 2002; Arming Pilots Against Terrorism Act; Chief Human Capital Officers Act of 2002; Critical Infrastructure Information Act of 2002; Cyber Security Enhancement Act of 2002; Federal Information Security Management Act of 2002; Homeland Security Information Sharing Act; Protection of Public Property Act; SAFETY Act; Safe Explosives Act; Support Anti-terrorism by Fostering Effective Technologies Act of 2002; Armed Pilots bill; Aviation Security Extension bill	Pub. L. 107–296 (text) (PDF)
107-297	November 26, 2002	Terrorism Risk Insurance Act of 2002	To ensure the continued financial capacity of insurers to provide coverage for risks from terrorism; Terrorism Risk Protection Act; Insurers Risks From Terrorism bill; Terrorism Insurance bill	Pub. L. 107–297 (text) (PDF)
107-298	November 26, 2002	Real Interstate Driver Equity Act of 2002	To amend title 49, United States Code, to prohibit States from requiring a license or fee because a motor vehicle is providing interstate pre-arranged ground transportation service, and for other purposes; Real Interstate Driver Equity Act of 2001	Pub. L. 107–298 (text) (PDF)
107-299	November 26, 2002	National Sea Grant College Program Act Amendments of 2002	To reauthorize the National Sea Grant College Program Act, and for other purposes; National Sea Grant College Program Act Amendments of 2001	Pub. L. 107–299 (text) (PDF)
107-300	November 26, 2002	Improper Payments Information Act of 2002	To provide for estimates and reports of improper payments by Federal agencies; To provide for reduction of improper payments by Federal agencies; Improper Payments Reduction Act of 2002	Pub. L. 107–300 (text) (PDF)
107-301	November 26, 2002	Improper Payments Reduction Act of 2002	An act to facilitate the use of a portion of the former O'Reilly General Hospital in Springfield, Missouri, by the local Boys and Girls Club through the release of the reversionary interest and other interests retained by the United States in 1955 when the land was conveyed to the State of Missouri	Pub. L. 107–301 (text) (PDF)
107-302	November 26, 2002	Court Services and Offender Supervision Agency Interstate Supervision Act of 2002	A bill to authorize the Court Services and Offender Supervision Agency of the District of Columbia to provide for the interstate supervision of offenders on parole, probation, and supervised release	Pub. L. 107–302 (text) (PDF)
107-303	November 27, 2002	Great Lakes and Lake Champlain Act of 2002	A bill to amend the Federal Water Pollution Control Act to authorize the Administrator of the Environmental Protection Agency to carry out projects and conduct research for remediation of sediment contamination in areas of concern in the Great Lakes, and for other purposes; An Act to amend the Federal Water Pollution Control Act to authorize the Administrator of the Environmental Protection Agency to provide assistance for remediation of sediment contamination in areas of concern, to authorize assistance for research and development of innovative technologies for such remediation, and to amend the Federal Water Pollution Control Act and the Water Resources Development Act of 2000 to modify provisions relating to the Lake Champlain basin, and for other purposes; To amend the Federal Water Pollution Control Act to authorize the Administrator of the Environmental Protection Agency to make grants for remediation of sediment contamination in areas of concern and to authorize assistance for research and development of innovative technologies for such purposes; Daniel Patrick Moynihan Lake Champlain Basin Program Act of 2002; Great Lakes Legacy Act of 2001; Great Lakes Legacy Act of 2002; Great Lakes and Lake Champlain Program Act of 2002	Pub. L. 107–303 (text) (PDF)
107-304	November 27, 2002	Great Lakes and Lake Champlain Program Act of 2002	An act to amend title 5, United States Code, to allow certain catch-up contributions to the Thrift Savings Plan to be made by participants age 50 or over	Pub. L. 107–304 (text) (PDF)
107-305	November 27, 2002	Cyber Security Research and Development Act	To authorize funding for computer and network security research and development and research fellowship programs, and for other purposes	Pub. L. 107–305 (text) (PDF)
107-306	November 27, 2002	Intelligence Authorization Act for Fiscal Year 2003	To authorize appropriations for fiscal year 2003 for intelligence and intelligence-related activities of the United States Government, the Community Management Account, and the Central Intelligence Agency Retirement and Disability System, and for other purposes; Counterintelligence Enhancement Act of 2002; Homeland Security Information Sharing Act; Commission to Investigate 9/11 Attacks bill; Intelligence Authorization bill, FY2003	Pub. L. 107–306 (text) (PDF)
107-307	December 2, 2002	Product Packaging Protection Act of 2002	To amend title 18, United States Code, with respect to consumer product protection; Consumer Product Protection Act of 2001; Consumer Product Protection Act of 2002	Pub. L. 107–307 (text) (PDF)
107-308	December 2, 2002	North American Wetlands Conservation Reauthorization Act	To reauthorize the North American Wetlands Conservation Act, and for other purposes	Pub. L. 107–308 (text) (PDF)
107-309	December 2, 2002	Consumer Product Protection Act of 2002	An act to amend title 36, United States Code, to clarify the requirements for eligibility in the American Legion	Pub. L. 107–309 (text) (PDF)
107-310	December 2, 2002	Dam Safety and Security Act of 2003	To reauthorize the national dam safety program, and for other purposes; Dam Safety and Security Act of 2002	Pub. L. 107–310 (text) (PDF)
107-311	December 2, 2002	Armed Forces Domestic Security Act	To amend title 10, United States Code, to provide for the enforcement and effectiveness of civilian orders of protection on military installations	Pub. L. 107–311 (text) (PDF)
107-312	December 2, 2002	Dam Safety and Security Act of 2002	An act to reduce preexisting PAYGO balances, and for other purposes	Pub. L. 107–312 (text) (PDF)
107-313	December 2, 2002	Mental Health Parity Reauthorization Act of 2002	To amend the Employee Retirement Income Security Act of 1974 and the Public Health Service Act to extend the mental health benefits parity provisions for an additional year	Pub. L. 107–313 (text) (PDF)
107-314	December 2, 2002	Bob Stump National Defense Authorization Act for Fiscal Year 2003	To authorize appropriations for fiscal year 2003 for military activities of the Department of Defense, and for military construction, to prescribe military personnel strengths for fiscal year 2003, and for other purposes; To authorize appropriations for fiscal year 2003 for military activities of the Department of Defense, for military construction, and for defense activities of the Department of Energy, to prescribe personnel strengths for such fiscal year for the Armed Forces, and for other purposes; Atomic Energy Defense Act; Cost of War Against Terrorism Authorization Act of 2002; Department of Defense-Department of Veterans Affairs Health Resources Sharing and Performance Improvement Act of 2002; Department of Energy National Security Authorizations General Provisions Act; Military Construction Authorization Act for Fiscal Year 2003; National Defense Authorization Act for Fiscal Year 2003; Receipt of Military Retirement and VA Disability Benefits bill	Pub. L. 107–314 (text) (PDF)
107-315	December 2, 2002	National Defense Authorization Act for Fiscal Year 2003	Approving the location of the commemorative work in the District of Columbia honoring former President John Adams	Pub. L. 107–315 (text) (PDF)
107-316	December 2, 2002	Paul and Sheila Wellstone Center for Community Building Act	A bill to provide a grant for the construction of a new community center in St. Paul, Minnesota, in honor of the late Senator Paul Wellstone and his beloved wife, Sheila	Pub. L. 107–316 (text) (PDF)
107-317	December 4, 2002	Dot Kids Implementation and Efficiency Act of 2002	To facilitate the creation of a new, second-level Internet domain within the United States country code domain that will be a haven for material that promotes positive experiences for children and families using the Internet, provides a safe online environment for children, and helps to prevent children from being exposed to harmful material on the Internet, and for other purposes; Dot Kids Internet Domain bill	Pub. L. 107–317 (text) (PDF)
107-318	December 4, 2002	Anton's Law	To provide for the improvement of the safety of child restraints in passenger motor vehicles, and for other purposes; Child Safety Enhancement Act of 2002	Pub. L. 107–318 (text) (PDF)
107-319	December 4, 2002	Child Safety Enhancement Act of 2002	An act to amend the Consumer Product Safety Act to provide that low-speed electric bicycles are consumer products subject to such Act	Pub. L. 107–319 (text) (PDF)
107-320	December 4, 2002	(No short title)	An act to direct the Secretary of the Army to convey a parcel of land to Chatham County, Georgia	Pub. L. 107–320 (text) (PDF)
107-321	December 4, 2002	Small Webcaster Settlement Act of 2002	To amend title 17, United States Code, with respect to the statutory license for webcasting; To suspend for a period of 6 months the determination of the Librarian of Congress of July 8, 2002, relating to rates and terms for the digital performance of sound recordings and ephemeral recordings	Pub. L. 107–321 (text) (PDF)
107-322	December 4, 2002	(No short title)	An act to extend the deadline for commencement of construction of a hydroelectric project in the State of North Carolina	Pub. L. 107–322 (text) (PDF)
107-323	December 4, 2002	POW/MIA Memorial Flag Act of 2002	A bill to require the display of the POW/MIA flag at the World War II Memorial, the Korean War Veterans Memorial, and the Vietnam Veterans Memorial; POW/MIA Memorial Flag Act of 2001	Pub. L. 107–323 (text) (PDF)
107-324	December 4, 2002	POW/MIA Memorial Flag Act of 2001	An act to direct the Secretary of the Interior to convey certain land to the city of Haines, Oregon	Pub. L. 107–324 (text) (PDF)
107-325	December 4, 2002	Old Spanish Trail Recognition Act of 2002	A bill to amend the National Trails System Act to designate the Old Spanish Trail as a National Historic Trail	Pub. L. 107–325 (text) (PDF)
107-326	December 4, 2002	FHA Downpayment Simplification Act of 2002	A bill to amend the National Housing Act to simplify the downpayment requirements for FHA mortgage insurance for single family homebuyers	Pub. L. 107–326 (text) (PDF)
107-327	December 4, 2002	Afghanistan Freedom Support Act of 2002	A bill to authorize economic and democratic development assistance for Afghanistan and to authorize military assistance for Afghanistan and certain other foreign countries	Pub. L. 107–327 (text) (PDF)
107-328	December 4, 2002	(No short title)	Joint resolution relative to the convening of the first session of the One Hundred Eighth Congress	Pub. L. 107–328 (text) (PDF)
107-329	December 6, 2002	Timpanogos Interagency Land Exchange Act	A bill to provide for the acquisition of land and construction of an interagency administrative and visitor facility at the entrance to American Fork Canyon, Utah, and for other purposes; Timpanogos Interagency Land Exchange Act of 2001	Pub. L. 107–329 (text) (PDF)
107-330	December 6, 2002	Veterans Benefits Improvement Act of 2002	A bill to amend title 38, United States Code, to enhance compensation for veterans with hearing loss, and for other purposes; An Act to amend title 38, United States Code, to improve authorities of the Department of Veterans Affairs relating to veterans' compensation, dependency and indemnity compensation, and pension benefits, education, benefits, housing benefits, memorial affairs benefits, life insurance benefits, and certain other benefits for veterans, to improve the administration of benefits for veterans, to make improvements in procedures relating to judicial review of veterans' claims for benefits, and for other purposes; Veterans Hearing Loss Compensation Act of 2002	Pub. L. 107–330 (text) (PDF)
107-331	December 13, 2002	Indian Financing Amendments Act of 2002	A bill to amend the Indian Financing Act of 1974 to improve the effectiveness of the Indian loan guarantee and insurance program; Cherokee, Choctaw, and Chickasaw Nations Claims Settlement Act; Indian Financing Act Amendments of 2002; Jicarilla Apache Reservation Rural Water System Act; Rocky Boy's/North Central Montana Regional Water System Act of 2002; Yankton Sioux Tribe and Santee Sioux Tribe Equitable Compensation Act	Pub. L. 107–331 (text) (PDF)
107-332	December 16, 2002	Homestead National Monument of America Additions Act	To provide for additional lands to be included within the boundaries of the Homestead National Monument of America in the State of Nebraska, and for other purposes	Pub. L. 107–332 (text) (PDF)
107-333	December 16, 2002	Guam War Claims Review Commission Act	To establish the Guam War Claims Review Commission	Pub. L. 107–333 (text) (PDF)
107-334	December 16, 2002	Mount Nebo Wilderness Boundary Adjustment Act	To make certain adjustments to the boundaries of the Mount Nebo Wilderness Area, and for other purposes	Pub. L. 107–334 (text) (PDF)
107-335	December 16, 2002	Lease Lot Conveyance Act of 2002	To direct the Secretary of the Interior to convey certain properties in the vicinity of the Elephant Butte Reservoir and the Caballo Reservoir, New Mexico; Lease Lot Conveyance Act of 2001	Pub. L. 107–335 (text) (PDF)
107-336	December 16, 2002	(No short title)	An act to authorize the Secretary of the Interior to make adjustments to the boundary of the National Park of American Samoa to include certain portions of the islands of Ofu and Olosega within the park, and for other purposes	Pub. L. 107–336 (text) (PDF)
107-337	December 16, 2002	Buffalo Bayou National Heritage Area Study Act	To authorize the Secretary of the Interior to study the suitability and feasibility of establishing the Buffalo Bayou National Heritage Area in west Houston, Texas	Pub. L. 107–337 (text) (PDF)
107-338	December 16, 2002	Metacomet-Monadnock-Mattabesett Trail Study Act of 2002	To amend the National Trails System Act to designate the Metacomet-Monadnock-Mattabesett Trail extending through western Massachusetts and central Connecticut for study for potential addition to the National Trails System; To amend the National Trails System Act to designate the Metacomet-Monadnock-Sunapee-Mattabesett Trail extending through western New Hampshire, western Massachusetts, and central Connecticut for study for potential addition to the National Trails System; Metacomet-Monadnock-Mattabesett Trail Study Act of 2001; Metacomet-Monadnock-Sunapee-Mattabesett Trail Study Act of 2001	Pub. L. 107–338 (text) (PDF)
107-339	December 16, 2002	Fallon Rail Freight Loading Facility Transfer Act	To provide for the sale of certain real property within the Newlands Project in Nevada, to the city of Fallon, Nevada	Pub. L. 107–339 (text) (PDF)
107-340	December 16, 2002	Pu'uhonua O Honaunau National Historical Park Addition Act of 2002	To amend the Act that established the Puʻuhonua o Hōnaunau National Historical Park to expand the boundaries of that park	Pub. L. 107–340 (text) (PDF)
107-341	December 16, 2002	Metacomet-Monadnock-Sunapee-Mattabesett Trail Study Act of 2001	An act to direct the Secretary of the Interior to study the suitability and feasibility of designating the Waco Mammoth Site Area in Waco, Texas, as a unit of the National Park System, and for other purposes	Pub. L. 107–341 (text) (PDF)
107-342	December 17, 2002	(No short title)	An act to amend the Omnibus Parks and Public Lands Management Act of 1996 to provide adequate funding authorization for the Vancouver National Historic Reserve	Pub. L. 107–342 (text) (PDF)
107-343	December 17, 2002	(No short title)	An act to authorize the Secretary of the Interior to conduct a special resource study of Virginia Key Beach Park in Biscayne Bay, Florida, for possible inclusion in the National Park System	Pub. L. 107–343 (text) (PDF)
107-344	December 17, 2002	(No short title)	An act to amend the Reclamation Wastewater and Groundwater Study and Facilities Act to authorize the Secretary of the Interior to participate in the design, planning, and construction of a project to reclaim and reuse wastewater within and outside of the service area of the Lakehaven Utility District, Washington	Pub. L. 107–344 (text) (PDF)
107-345	December 17, 2002	(No short title)	An act to amend title 10, United States Code, to make receipts collected from mineral leasing activities on certain naval oil shale reserves available to cover environmental restoration, waste management, and environmental compliance costs incurred by the United States with respect to the reserves	Pub. L. 107–345 (text) (PDF)
107-346	December 17, 2002	Virgin River Dinosaur Footprint Preserve Act	To convey certain property to the city of St. George, Utah, in order to provide for the protection and preservation of certain rare paleontological resources on that property, and for other purposes	Pub. L. 107–346 (text) (PDF)
107-347	December 17, 2002	E-Government Act of 2002	To enhance the management and promotion of electronic Government services and processes by establishing a Federal Chief Information Officer within the Office of Management and Budget, and by establishing a broad framework of measures that require using Internet-based information technology to enhance citizen access to Government information and services, and for other purposes; Confidential Information Protection and Statistical Efficiency Act of 2002; E-Government Act of 2001; Federal Information Security Management Act of 2002; E-Gov Act; Electronic Government Act	Pub. L. 107–347 (text) (PDF)
107-348	December 17, 2002	Muscle Shoals National Heritage Area Study Act of 2002	To direct the Secretary of the Interior to conduct a study of the suitability and feasibility of establishing the Muscle Shoals National Heritage Area in Alabama, and for other purposes; Muscle Shoals National Heritage Area Study Act of 2001	Pub. L. 107–348 (text) (PDF)
107-349	December 17, 2002	Klamath Basin Emergency Operation and Maintenance Refund Act of 2001	To authorize payments to certain Klamath Project water distribution entities for amounts assessed by the entities for operation and maintenance of the Project's transferred works for 2001, to authorize refunds to such entities of amounts collected by the Bureau of Reclamation for reserved works for 2001, and for other purposes; To authorize refunds of amounts collected from Klamath Project irrigation and drainage districts for operation and maintenance of the Project's transferred and reserved works for water year 2001, and for other purposes	Pub. L. 107–349 (text) (PDF)
107-350	December 17, 2002	(No short title)	An act to provide for the conveyance of certain public land in Clark County, Nevada, for use as a shooting range	Pub. L. 107–350 (text) (PDF)
107-351	December 17, 2002	Lower Rio Grande Valley Water Resources Conservation and Improvement Act of 2002	To amend the Lower Rio Grande Valley Water Resources Conservation and Improvement Act of 2000 to authorize additional projects under that Act, and for other purposes; Lower Rio Grande Valley Water Resources Conservation and Improvement Act of 2001	Pub. L. 107–351 (text) (PDF)
107-352	December 17, 2002	(No short title)	An act to consent to certain amendments to the New Hampshire-Vermont Interstate School Compact	Pub. L. 107–352 (text) (PDF)
107-353	December 17, 2002	California Five Mile Regional Learning Center Transfer Act	To provide for the conveyance of Forest Service facilities and lands comprising the Five Mile Regional Learning Center in the State of California to the Clovis Unified School District, to authorize a new special use permit regarding the continued use of unconveyed lands comprising the center, and for other purposes	Pub. L. 107–353 (text) (PDF)
107-354	December 17, 2002	(No short title)	An act to revise the boundaries of the George Washington Birthplace National Monument, and for other purposes	Pub. L. 107–354 (text) (PDF)
107-355	December 17, 2002	Pipeline Safety Improvement Act of 2002	To amend title 49, United States Code, to enhance the security and safety of pipelines; Pipeline Infrastructure Protection To Enhance Security and Safety Act; Pipeline Safety bill	Pub. L. 107–355 (text) (PDF)
107-356	December 17, 2002	New River Gorge Boundary Act of 2002	To modify the boundaries of the New River Gorge National River, West Virginia	Pub. L. 107–356 (text) (PDF)
107-357	December 17, 2002	(No short title)	An act to amend the Act entitled "An Act to authorize the Establishment of the Andersonville National Historic Site in the State of Georgia, and for other purposes" to provide for the addition of certain donated lands to the Andersonville National Historic Site	Pub. L. 107–357 (text) (PDF)
107-358	December 17, 2002	Holocaust Restitution Tax Fairness Act of 2002	To repeal the sunset of the Economic Growth and Tax Relief Reconciliation Act of 2001 with respect to the exclusion from Federal income tax for restitution received by victims of the Nazi regime	Pub. L. 107–358 (text) (PDF)
107-359	December 17, 2002	Civil War Battlefield Preservation Act of 2002	To amend the American Battlefield Protection Act of 1996 to authorize the Secretary of the Interior to establish a battlefield acquisition grant program	Pub. L. 107–359 (text) (PDF)
107-360	December 17, 2002	(No short title)	An act to amend the Public Health Service Act with respect to special diabetes programs for Type I diabetes and Indians	Pub. L. 107–360 (text) (PDF)
107-361	December 17, 2002	(No short title)	An act to authorize the Secretary of the Interior to convey certain public land within the Sand Mountain Wilderness Study Area in the State of Idaho to resolve an occupancy encroachment dating back to 1971	Pub. L. 107–361 (text) (PDF)
107-362	December 19, 2002	Russian River Land Act	To resolve the claims of Cook Inlet Region, Inc., to lands adjacent to the Russian River in the State of Alaska	Pub. L. 107–362 (text) (PDF)
107-363	December 19, 2002	Bainbridge Island Japanese-American Memorial Study Act of 2002	To direct the Secretary of the Interior to conduct a study of the site commonly known as Eagledale Ferry Dock at Taylor Avenue in the State of Washington for potential inclusion in the National Park System	Pub. L. 107–363 (text) (PDF)
107-364	December 19, 2002	Gunn McKay Nature Preserve Act	To designate certain Federal lands in the State of Utah as the Gunn McKay Nature Preserve, and for other purposes	Pub. L. 107–364 (text) (PDF)
107-365	December 19, 2002	Caribbean National Forest Wild and Scenic Rivers Act of 2002	To designate certain waterways in the Caribbean National Forest in the Commonwealth of Puerto Rico as components of the National Wild and Scenic Rivers System, and for other purposes	Pub. L. 107–365 (text) (PDF)
107-366	December 19, 2002	(No short title)	An act to amend the Central Utah Project Completion Act to clarify the responsibilities of the Secretary of the Interior with respect to the Central Utah Project, to redirect unexpended budget authority for the Central Utah Project for wastewater treatment and reuse and other purposes, to provide for prepayment of repayment contracts for municipal and industrial water delivery facilities, and to eliminate a deadline for such prepayment	Pub. L. 107–366 (text) (PDF)
107-367	December 19, 2002	(No short title)	An act to reauthorize the Mni Wiconi Rural Water Supply Project	Pub. L. 107–367 (text) (PDF)
107-368	December 19, 2002	National Science Foundation Authorization Act of 2002	An act to authorize appropriations for fiscal years 2003, 2004, 2005, 2006, and 2007 for the National Science Foundation, and for other purposes; To authorize appropriations for fiscal years 2003, 2004, and 2005 for the National Science Foundation, and for other purposes; Investing in America's Future Act of 2002	Pub. L. 107–368 (text) (PDF)
107-369	December 19, 2002	Allegheny Portage Railroad National Historic Site Boundary Revision Act	To revise the boundary of the Allegheny Portage Railroad National Historic Site, and for other purposes	Pub. L. 107–369 (text) (PDF)
107-370	December 19, 2002	Big Sur Wilderness and Conservation Act of 2002	To designate certain lands in the State of California as components of the National Wilderness Preservation System, and for other purposes	Pub. L. 107–370 (text) (PDF)
107-371	December 19, 2002	(No short title)	An act to direct the Secretary of the Interior to disclaim any Federal interest in lands adjacent to Spirit Lake and Twin Lakes in the State of Idaho resulting from possible omission of lands from an 1880 survey	Pub. L. 107–371 (text) (PDF)
107-372	December 19, 2002	Hydrographic Services Improvement Act Amendments of 2002	To reauthorize the Hydrographic Services Improvement Act of 1998, and for other purposes	Pub. L. 107–372 (text) (PDF)
107-373	December 19, 2002	Cedar Creek and Belle Grove National Historical Park Act	To designate the Cedar Creek and Belle Grove Plantation National Historical Park as a unit of the National Park System, and for other purposes; To designate the Cedar Creek and Belle Grove National Historical Park as a unit of the National Park System; Cedar Creek Battlefield and Belle Grove Plantation National Historical Park Act	Pub. L. 107–373 (text) (PDF)
107-374	December 19, 2002	(No short title)	An act to direct the Secretary of the Interior to grant to Deschutes and Crook Counties in the State of Oregon a right-of-way to West Butte Road	Pub. L. 107–374 (text) (PDF)
107-375	December 19, 2002	(No short title)	An act to extend the periods of authorization for the Secretary of the Interior to implement capital construction projects associated with the endangered fish recovery implementation programs for the Upper Colorado and San Juan River Basins	Pub. L. 107–375 (text) (PDF)
107-376	December 19, 2002	(No short title)	An act to extend the deadline for commencement of construction of a hydroelectric project in the State of Oregon	Pub. L. 107–376 (text) (PDF)
107-377	December 19, 2002	Protection of Family Farmers Act of 2002	To extend for 6 months the period for which chapter 12 of title 11 of the United States Code is reenacted; Farmer Bankruptcy bill	Pub. L. 107–377 (text) (PDF)

== Private laws ==
Private law number (Linked to Wikisource)	Date of enactment	Official short title	Description	Citation
107-1	July 17, 2001	(No short title)	An act for the relief of Rita Mirembe Revell (a.k.a. Margaret Rita Mirembe).	116 Stat. 2471
107-2	October 1, 2002	(No short title)	An act for the relief of retired Sergeant First Class James D. Benoit and Wan Sook Benoit	116 Stat. 3119
107-3	October 4, 2002	(No short title)	An act for the relief of Barbara Makuch	116 Stat. 3121
107-4	October 4, 2002	(No short title)	An act for the relief of Eugene Makuch	116 Stat. 3122
107-5	November 5, 2002	(No short title)	An act for the relief of Anisha Goveas Foti	116 Stat. 3123
107-6	December 2, 2002	(No short title)	An act for the relief of So Hyun Jun	116 Stat. 3124

== Treaties ==
No treaties have been enacted this Congress.

== See also ==
- List of United States federal legislation
- List of acts of the 106th United States Congress
- List of acts of the 108th United States Congress
