= Emergency Medical Services for Children Reauthorization Act of 2014 =

Proposed U.S. federal legislation

- Long title: To amend the Public Health Service Act to reauthorize the Emergency Medical Services for Children Program.
- Announced in: the 113th United States Congress
- Sponsored by: Sen. Robert P. Casey, Jr. (D, PA)
- Number of co-sponsors: 1

Codification
- U.S.C. sections affected: 42 U.S.C. § 300w–9
- Authorizations of appropriations: $151,938,280 over year(s) 2015, 2016, 2017, 2018 and 2019

Legislative history
- Introduced in the Senate as S. 2154 by Sen. Robert P. Casey, Jr. (D, PA) on March 25, 2014; Committee consideration by United States Senate Committee on Health, Education, Labor, and Pensions; Passed the Senate on September 10, 2014 (unanimous consent)

The Emergency Medical Services for Children Reauthorization Act of 2014 (S. 2154) is a bill that would amend the Public Health Service Act to reauthorize the Emergency Medical Services for Children Program through FY2019. The bill would authorize appropriations of about $20 million in 2015 and $101 million over the 2015-2019 period.

The bill was introduced into the United States Senate during the 113th United States Congress.

== Background ==
The Emergency Medical Services for Children (EMSC) program is a US federal government health initiative. It is administered by the U.S. Department of Health and Human Services’ Health Resources and Services Administration (HRSA), and the Maternal and Child Health Bureau (MCHB). Its aim is to reduce child and youth disability and death due to severe illness or injury by increasing awareness among health professionals, providers, and planners and the general public of the special (physiological and psychological) needs of children receiving emergency medical care.

== Provisions of the bill ==
This summary is based largely on the summary provided by the Congressional Research Service, a public domain source.

The Emergency Medical Services for Children Reauthorization Act of 2014 would amend the Public Health Service Act to reauthorize the Emergency Medical Services for Children Program through FY2019.

== Congressional Budget Office report ==
This summary is based largely on the summary provided by the Congressional Budget Office, as reported by the Senate Committee on Health, Education, Labor, and Pensions on July 23, 2014. This is a public domain source.

S. 2154 would amend the Public Health Service Act to reauthorize activities intended to reduce child morbidity and mortality by improving emergency medical services for children. Those activities are supported by grants administered by the Health Resources and Services Administration (HRSA).

The bill would authorize appropriations of about $20 million in 2015 and $101 million over the 2015-2019 period. The Congressional Budget Office (CBO) estimates that implementing S. 2154 would cost $90 million over the 2015-2019 period, assuming appropriation of the authorized amounts. Pay-as-you-go procedures do not apply to this legislation because it would not affect direct spending or revenues.

The bill contains no intergovernmental or private-sector mandates as defined in the Unfunded Mandates Reform Act.

== Procedural history ==
The Emergency Medical Services for Children Reauthorization Act of 2014 was introduced into the United States Senate on March 25, 2014, by Sen. Robert P. Casey, Jr. (D, PA). It was referred to the United States Senate Committee on Health, Education, Labor, and Pensions. On September 10, 2014, the Senate voted to pass the bill with unanimous consent.

== Debate and discussion ==
The American Academy of Pediatrics supported the bill, saying that "the EMSC program is there for children during times when they are especially vulnerable and most in need of medical equipment, care and services designed especially for them."

Senator Casey, who introduced the bill, argued that "this low-cost program has saved the lives of countless children and adolescents in the past 30 years, and I urge my colleagues to support this critically important program."

Senator Orrin Hatch (R-UT), who co-sponsored the bill, argued that "children require specialized medical care, and that specialized care comes with unique challenges. The EMSC program helps ensure that some of our country's most vulnerable have access to the care they need, and I've been proud to support it all these years."

== See also ==
- List of bills in the 113th United States Congress
