= Public Health Service Act =

US federal law

- Long title: An Act to consolidate and revise the laws relating to the Public Health Service, and for other purposes.
- Enacted by: the 78th United States Congress
- Effective: July 1, 1944

Citations
- Public law: Pub. L. 78–410
- Statutes at Large: 58 Stat. 682, Chapter 373

Codification
- Titles amended: 42 U.S.C.: Public Health and Social Welfare
- U.S.C. sections created: 42 U.S.C. ch. 6A § 201 et seq.

Legislative history
- Introduced in the House as H.R. 4624 by Alfred L. Bulwinkle (D–NC) on April 18, 1944; Committee consideration by Committee on Interstate and Foreign Commerce, Senate Education and Labor; Passed the House on May 22, 1944; Passed the Senate on June 22, 1944 with amendment; House agreed to Senate amendment on June 23, 1944 (Agreed); Signed into law by President Franklin D. Roosevelt on July 1, 1944

Major amendments
- Family Planning Services and Population Research Act of 1970; National Cancer Act of 1971; Health Insurance Portability and Accountability Act of 1996; Muscular Dystrophy Community Assistance Research and Education Amendments of 2001; Hematological Cancer Research Investment and Education Act of 2001; Newborn Screening Saves Lives Act of 2007; Patient Protection and Affordable Care Act of 2010; Pandemic and All-Hazards Preparedness Reauthorization Act of 2013

The Public Health Service Act is a United States federal law enacted in 1944. The full act is codified in Title 42 of the United States Code (The Public Health and Welfare), Chapter 6A (Public Health Service). This Act provided a legislative basis for the provision of public health services in the United States.

== Contents ==
The Public Health Service Act clearly established the federal government's quarantine authority for the first time. It gave the United States Public Health Service responsibility for preventing the introduction, transmission and spread of communicable diseases from foreign countries into the United States.

The Public Health Service Act granted the original authority for scientists and special consultants to be appointed "without regard to the civil-service laws", known as a Title 42 appointment.

During COVID-19 pandemic, section 42 U.S.C. § 265 has been used for Title 42 expulsion.

== Amendments ==
It has since been amended many times. Some of these amendments are:

- Family Planning Services and Population Research Act of 1970 Pub. L. 91–572, which established Title X of the Public Health Service Act, dedicated to providing family planning services for those in need.
- National Cancer Act of 1971
- Health Insurance Portability and Accountability Act of 1996
- Health Center Consolidation Act of 1996
- National Institute of Biomedical Imaging and Bioengineering Establishment Act of 2000
- Muscular Dystrophy Community Assistance Research and Education Amendments of 2001
- Hematological Cancer Research Investment and Education Act of 2001
- Newborn Screening Saves Lives Act of 2007
- Patient Protection and Affordable Care Act of 2010
- Pandemic and All-Hazards Preparedness Reauthorization Act of 2013 (H.R. 307; 113th Congress)
- Suicide Training and Awareness Nationally Delivered for Universal Prevention Act of 2021 (S. 1543; 117th Congress)

== Proposed amendments ==
Other attempted amendments to the act have been proposed but failed:

- Stem Cell Research Enhancement Acts of 2005 and 2007
- 115TH CONGRESS 1ST SESSION H. R. 708 To amend title XXVII of the Public Health Service Act to change the permissible age variation in health insurance premium rates.
- One proposal to amend the Public Health Service Act is the Veteran Emergency Medical Technician Support Act of 2013 (H.R. 235), a bill in the 113th United States Congress. The bill was introduced on January 14, 2013 by Rep. Adam Kinzinger (R-IL). It passed the United States House of Representatives on February 12, 2013 by a voice vote, indicating that it was generally non-controversial. The Bill would amend the Public Health Service Act to direct the Secretary of Health and Human Services (HHS) to establish a demonstration program for states with a shortage of emergency medical technicians (EMTs) to streamline state requirements and procedures to assist veterans who completed military EMT training while serving in the Armed Forces to meet state EMT certification, licensure, and other requirements. The bill still needs to pass in the United States Senate and be signed by the President of the United States before it would become law.
- The Children's Hospital GME Support Reauthorization Act of 2013 (H.R. 297; 113th Congress) is a bill in the 113th United States Congress that would amend the Public Health Service Act to extend and reauthorize appropriations for payments to children's hospitals for expenses associated with operating approved graduate medical residency training programs. The portion of the Public Health Service Act that would be amended is Section 340E (42 U.S.C. 256e). The amendment would cover Fiscal Years 2013 - 2017. H.R. 297 passed the United States House of Representatives with a vote of 352-50 on February 4, 2013 (Roll no. 32).
- Emergency Medical Services for Children Reauthorization Act of 2014 (S. 2154; 113th Congress) is a bill in the 113th United States Congress that would amend the Public Health Service Act to reauthorize the Emergency Medical Services for Children Program through FY2019.

== Commentary ==
Since the passage of the Act, health services in the US subsequently have been marked by a history of underinvestment that has undermined the public health workforce and support for population health.
