= Hematological Cancer Research Investment and Education Act =

Amendment for the Public Service Act of 2001

Hematological Cancer Research Investment and Education Act of 2001
- Long title: An Act To amend the Public Health Service Act to provide for research, information, and education with respect to blood cancer.
- Enacted by: the 107th United States Congress

Citations
- Public law: Pub. L. 107–172 (text) (PDF)
- Statutes at Large: 116 Stat. 541

Codification
- Acts amended: Public Health Service Act

Legislative history
- Introduced in the Senate as S. 1094 by Kay Bailey Hutchison (R-TX) on June 22, 2001; Committee consideration by Committee on Health, Education, Labor, and Pensions; Passed the Senate on November 16, 2001 (unanimous consent); Passed the House on April 30, 2002 (voice vote); Signed into law by President George W. Bush on May 14, 2002

The Hematological Cancer Research Investment and Education Act of 2001 (Pub. L. 107–172 (text) (PDF)) amends the Public Health Service Act to allocate funding and establish directed research and education programs targeted at forms of blood cancer, in particular leukemia, lymphoma, and multiple myeloma.

The bill was introduced as S. 1094 by Senator Kay Bailey Hutchison of Texas in June 2001. Hutchinson's brother has had multiple myeloma and she worked for several years to pass legislation of this type. The bill came out through the Senate Committee on Health, Education, Labor, and Pensions, and passed the United States Senate by unanimous consent in November 2001. It went through the House Committee on Energy and Commerce and passed the U.S. House of Representatives on a voice vote in April 2002. It was signed into law by President George W. Bush on May 14, 2002.

The research provision of the bill, the Joe Moakley Research Excellence Program, requires the Director of the National Institutes of Health, through the National Cancer Institute, to expand and coordinate blood cancer research programs. It was named after former Massachusetts Congressman Joe Moakley, who died in May 2001 of myelodysplastic syndrome, a form of leukemia. The education provision of the bill, the Geraldine Ferraro Cancer Education Program, requires the Secretary of Health and Human Services to establish an education program for patients of such blood cancers and the general public. It is named after former New York Congresswoman and 1984 Democratic vice-presidential nominee Geraldine Ferraro, who has been battling multiple myeloma since 1998. Ferraro did not publicly disclose her disease until June 2001, when she appeared in Congressional hearings to advocate for passage of the Act.

An example of the Moakley program funding is $12.75 million to The University of Texas M. D. Anderson Cancer Center. The Ferraro program was not funded in 2003, but received $5 million funding in 2004.
