= Public Safety Officer Medal of Valor =

Award bestowed by the President of the United States

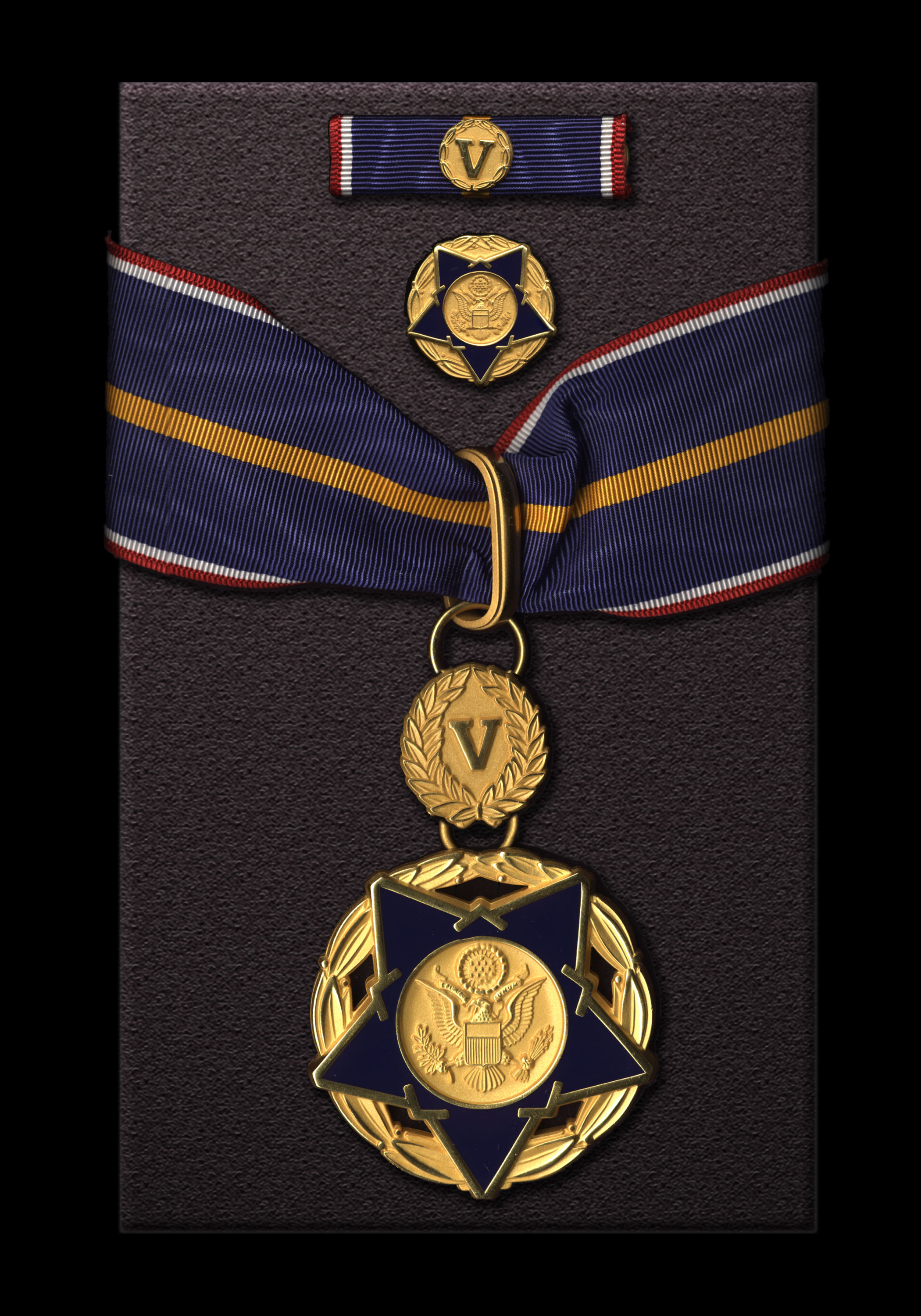
- Type: Medal
- Awarded for: "Actions above and beyond the call of duty; and exhibiting exceptional courage, extraordinary decisiveness and presence of mind; or an unusual swiftness of action, regardless of his or her personal safety, in an attempt to save or protect human life."
- Presented by: the President of the United States
- Eligibility: Firefighters; Law enforcement officers; EMS personnel
- Status: Active
- Established: Executive Order 13161, June 29, 2000
- First award: 2001

Highlights
- Total: 70
- Total awarded posthumously: 9
- Total recipients: 108
- Ribbon

Precedence
- Next (higher): Presidential Citizens Medal
- Next (lower): President's Award for Distinguished Federal Civilian Service

The Public Safety Officer Medal of Valor is the highest decoration for bravery exhibited by public safety officers in the United States, comparable to the military's Medal of Honor.

== History ==
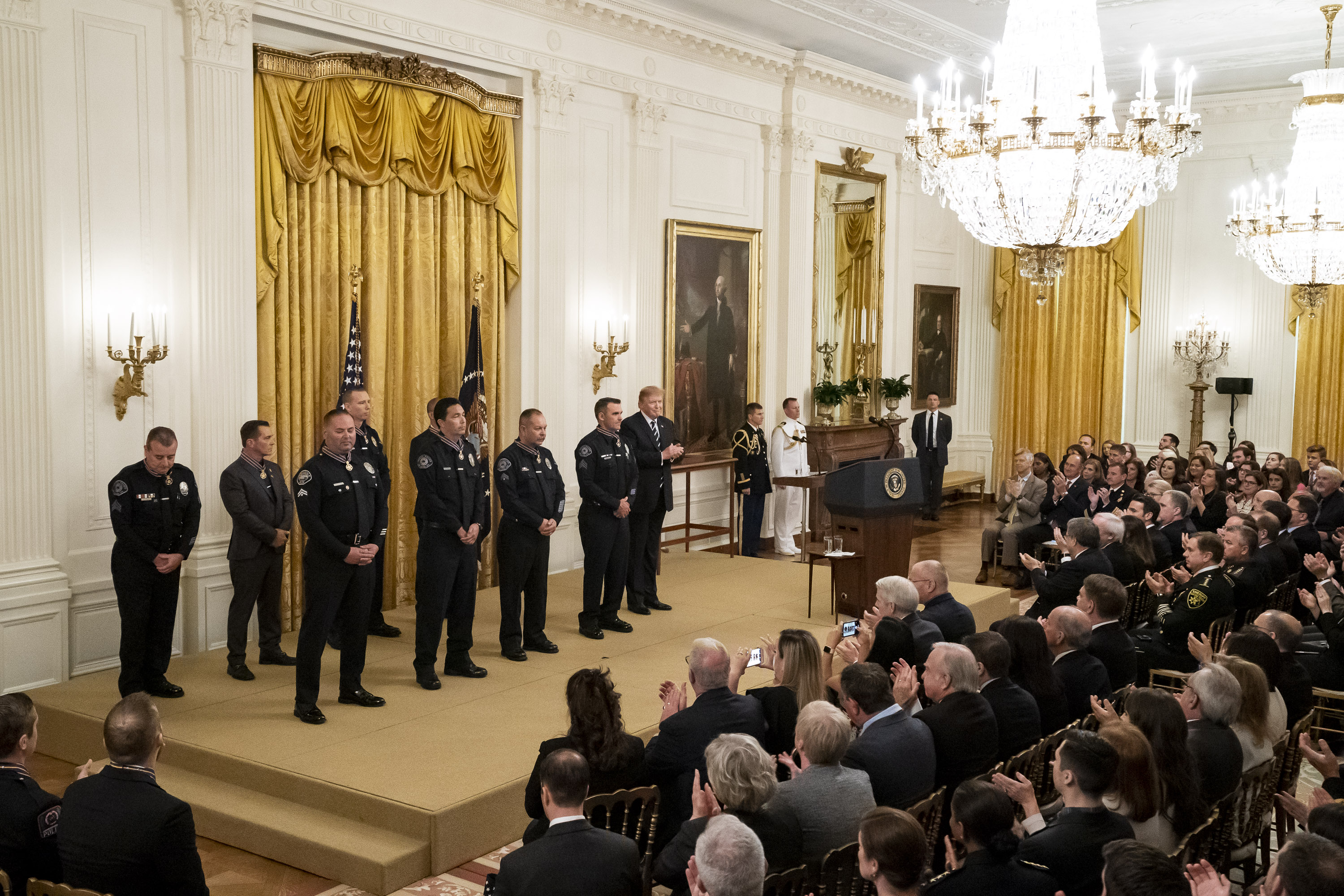
President Donald Trump presents the Public Safety Officer Medal of Valor in the East Room of the White House in May 2019

The original Medal of Valor was established on June 29, 2000, by President Bill Clinton with his issuance of Executive Order 13161 and was originally called the Presidential Medal of Valor for Public Safety Officers.

This award was later superseded to its current form with the enactment of the Public Safety Officer Medal of Valor Act of 2001 (Pub. L. 107–12 (text) (PDF), 115 Stat. 20, H.R. 802, May 30, 2001). It is still awarded and presented by the President of the United States but now it is done in the name of the United States Congress as recommended by the eleven-member Medal of Valor Review Board. The Attorney General no longer makes recommendations directly to the President but can provide input into the process via the Department of Justice's National Medal of Valor Office's support of the Review Board. The medal can still be awarded posthumously.

Before the establishment of the Medal of Valor, there were no Federal awards to specifically acknowledge the bravery performed by public safety officers throughout the United States; police and firefighting departments typically award their members medals at a state or local government level. The establishment of the Medal of Valor filled a huge void in the civilian decorations system of the United States, which was all the more timely given the catastrophe in New York City the following year during the September 11 attacks. The 442 public safety officers killed at World Trade Center and The Pentagon that day were awarded the 9/11 Heroes Medal of Valor, a similar but separate award.

== Symbolism ==
The Public Safety Officer Medal of Valor, which intentionally resembles the military's Medal of Honor, is a gilt, blue-enameled, five-pointed, upside-down star (i.e. one arm points downwards), with each arm formed by a letter "V" (for Valor), surrounded by a wreath of laurel. The central disc bears the obverse of the Great Seal of the United States. The reverse bears the legend "FOR EXTRAORDINARY VALOR ABOVE AND BEYOND THE CALL OF DUTY", with the name of the recipient engraved at the center. The medal is suspended on a gilt disc bearing a letter "V" surrounded by a wreath of laurels, which is in turn suspended on a neck ribbon, blue with white and red edge stripes, the national colors of the United States, and a gold center stripe, symbolizing honor.

When the ribbon alone is worn, it carries a miniature gold gilt disc bearing a letter "V" surrounded by a wreath of laurels. There is also a lapel pin, which is the miniature of the medal without suspension.

As the award is presented by the President, the Public Safety Officer Medal of Valor Act of 2001 also repealed the previously awarded President's Award For Outstanding Public Safety Service (President's Award) and revised the Federal Fire Prevention and Control Act of 1974 to remove the President's Award but keep the Secretary's Award For Distinguished Public Safety Service, which is an honorary award presented by the Director of the Federal Emergency Management Agency (FEMA) or the Attorney General for the recognition of outstanding and distinguished service by public safety officers.

== See also ==
- Awards and decorations of the United States government
