= Ferlins =

Protein family

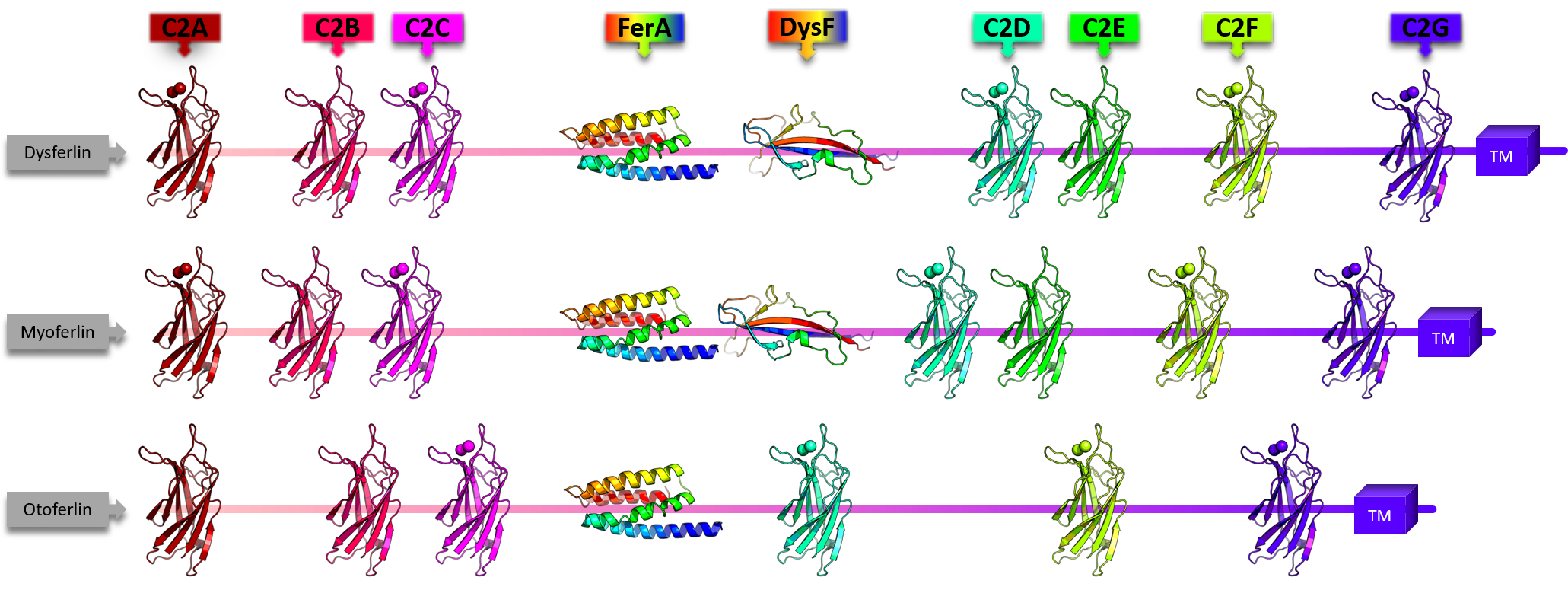
Schematic structures of dysferlin, myoferlin, and otoferlin; three ferlin proteins that are associated with human diseases. Lack of functional dysferlin can cause a group of muscular dystrophies knows as dysferlinopathies. Myoferlin is highly expressed in several types of cancer, and mutations in otoferlin can cause deafness.

Ferlins are an ancient protein family involved in vesicle fusion and membrane trafficking. Ferlins are distinguished by their multiple tandem C2 domains, and sometimes a FerA and a DysF domain. Mutations in ferlins can cause human diseases such as muscular dystrophy and deafness. Abnormalities in expression of myoferlin, a human ferlin protein, is also directly associated with higher mortality rate and tumor recurrence in several types of cancer, including pancreatic, colorectal, breast, cervical, stomach, ovarian, cervical, thyroid, endometrial, and oropharyngeal squamous cell carcinoma. In other animals, ferlin mutations can cause infertility.

Ferlins are type II transmembrane proteins (N-terminus on the cytoplasmic side of the membrane) and contain five to seven C2 domains linked in tandem and have a single-pass transmembrane domain located at the C-terminus. The C2 domains are denoted in order from amino-terminus to carboxyl-terminus as C2A to C2G. C2 domains are essentially calcium and phospholipid binding domains, evolved for cell membrane interactions. In fact, many proteins involved in signal transduction, membrane trafficking, and membrane fusion employ C2 domains to target the cell membrane. However, ferlins are unique for containing more C2 domains than any other proteins (between five and seven). FerA and DysF are two intermediate domains that are unique to ferlins. There is less known about FerA and DysF domains, however, mutations of these domains in dysferlin can also lead to muscular dystrophy.

As in other mammals, there are six ferlin genes in humans (Fer1L1-Fer1L6). Among them, Fer1L1-Fer1L3 have known disease relevance. Therefore, Fer1L1-Fer1L3 are better characterized compare to Fer1L4-Fer1L6 with unknown function and tissue localization. Fer1L1-Fer1L3 proteins each has a unique name and they correspond to dysferlin, myoferlin, and otoferlin accordingly.

== Discovery ==
The first member of ferlin protein family, fer-1, was discovered in nematode Caenorhabditis elegans. Fer-1 gene was first described in 1997 by Achanzar and Ward. Fer-1 is required for reproduction in C. elegans and was therefore named Fer-1 because of its involvement in fertility. The name is an abbreviation for "fertilization factor 1". The nomenclature in other ferlins in humans is Fer1Lx, where x is a number from 1-6, each identifying one of the six Fer1-like ferlins in humans.

== Evolution ==
Ferlins are ancient proteins and they have been identified in protists and metazoans, and are known to exist in a range of organisms from unicellular eukaryotes to humans, suggesting primordial functions for ferlins. More specifically, DysF domain and the last two C-terminal C2 domains followed by the C-terminal transmembrane domain (C2E-C2F-TM, containing approximately 489 amino acids) show a high degree of conservation. All ferlins contain several C2 domains. However, C2A may be missing in some ferlins. More specifically, from six human ferlins, three of them do not contain C2A domains. Another highly conserved domain is the N-terminal C2-FerI-C2 sequence. FerI is a motif detected by Pfam, however, the function of this conserved motif is currently unknown. Ferlins have been evolved into two groups, DysF-containing and non-DysF ferlins. Most invertebrates possess two ferlin proteins, one from each class. Most vertebrate however, have six ferlin genes, three of which DysF containing and the other three non-DysF ferlins, indicating that vertebrate ferlins are evolved and originated from the two ferlins in early metazoans. Both subgroups have been identified in early metazoans, suggesting the fundamental role associated to these proteins.

== Structure ==
Dysferlin DysF
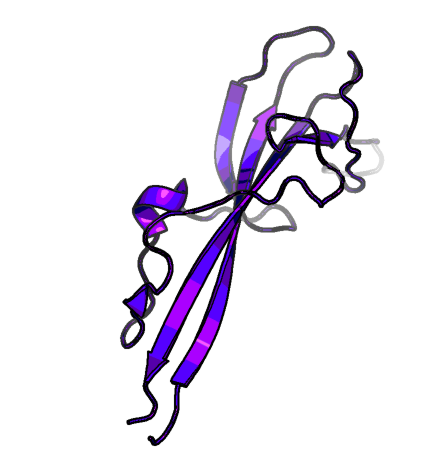
- Crystal structure of the inner human DysF domain of dysferlin

Identifiers
- Symbol: 4CAH
- SMART: SM00694

Ferlins are large proteins and currently the full length structure of ferlins is unknown. In order to understand their structural aspects, ferlin domains have been studied individually:

C2A domains are calcium and lipid binding domains made from 8 β-strands forming 2 sheets. The loops connecting the sheets form the calcium binding site. The β-sheet structure is conserved among C2 domains, however, the loops may have different features. Depending on the amino acids located at the calcium binding site and the loops, C2 domains can have different specificities for calcium and lipid binding, suggesting that they are evolved to function in different environments.

The DysF domain exists as an internal duplication where an inner DysF domain is surrounded by an outer DysF domain. Such structure is a result of gene duplication and both inner and outer DysF domains have adopted the same fold. The structure of DysF is mainly consist of two antiparallel long β-strands. To date, the crystallographic structure of human dysferlin and solution NMR structure of myoferlin DysF have been obtained by Altin Sula et al. and PryankPatel et al. accordingly. Myoferlin and dysferlin DysF domains show 61% sequence identity. A unique feature of DysF domains in both dysferlin and myoferlin is that these domains are held together by arginine/aromatic sidechain (specially tryptophan) stacking.

FerA had been predicted using Pfam and SMART and remained uncharacterized both structurally and functionally until recently. It had been determined by secondary structure prediction however, that FerA domain contains several helices. Recently, a model of FerA structure obtained by homology models have been confirmed by fitting the calculated model into the FerA structure obtained by small-angle X-ray scattering (SAXS) experiments. These structural models provided evidence that FerA contains four helices, which fold to form a four-helix bundle.

== Function ==
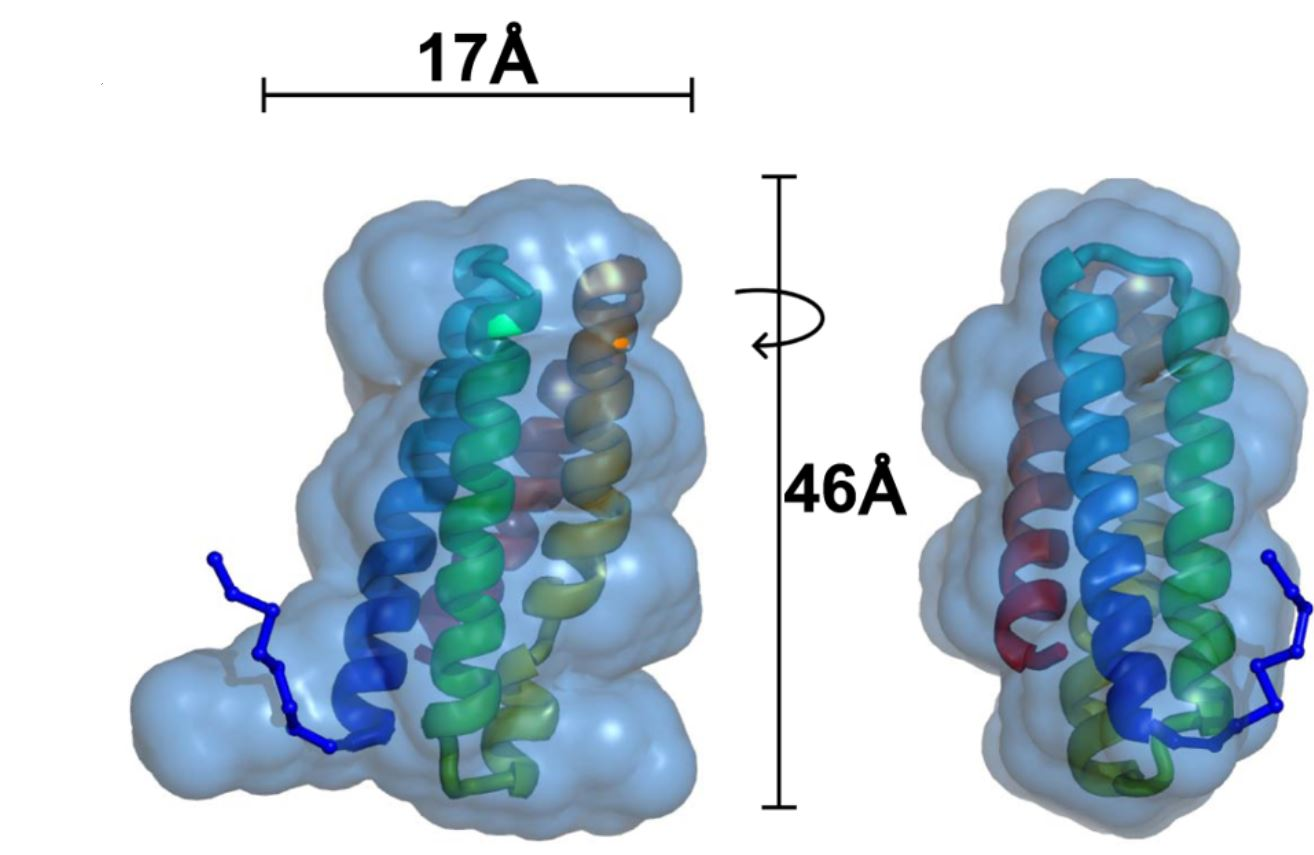
Superposition of dysferlin FerA structural model obtained by Robetta and ab initio bead model obtained by experimental Small Angel X-Ray Scattering experiments.

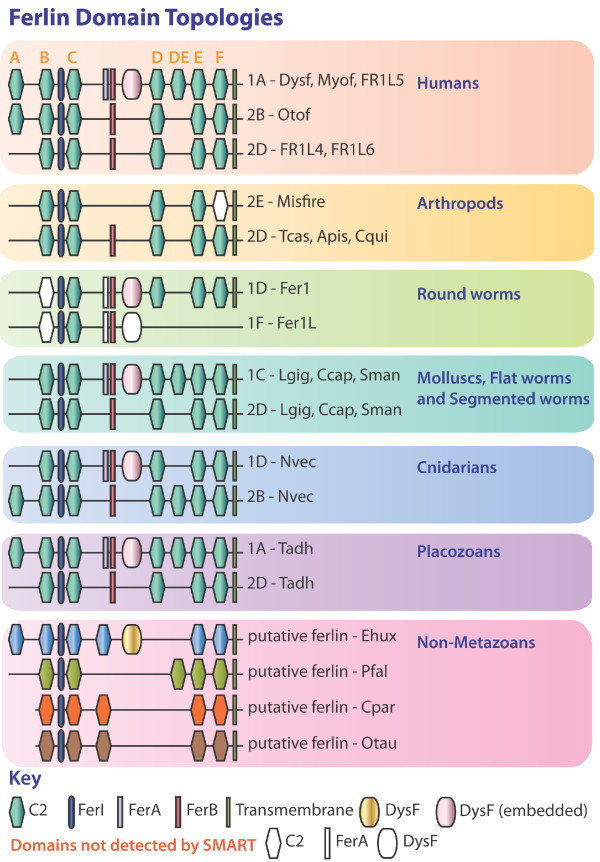
Topologies of ferlin domains. Labels A-F indicate: A: ferlin topology containing all seven C2 domains; B: (-)C2DE; C: (-)C2A; D: (-)C2A, (-)C2DE; E: (-)C2A, (-)C2DE, (-)FerB; F: (-)C2A, (-)C2 D, (-)C2E, (-)C2DE,(-)C2F. Different C2 domains are also labeled as C2A-C2F. In other studies, C2DE, C2E, and C2F are denoted as C2E, C2F, and C2G. In this figure, C2, DysF, and transmembrane are an amalgamation of SMART results, and FerA, FerB and FerI are an amalgamation of PFAM results.

Ferlins play roles in vesicle fusion and membrane trafficking. Different ferlins are found in various organs and they play specific roles. Fer-1 is a member of ferlin protein family, and a fertilization factor involved in fusion of vesicles called membraneous organelles with the sperm plasma membrane during spermatogenesis in C. elegans. In C. elegans spermatids are immobile and during sperm maturation mobility is gained after fusion of membraneous organelles with the plasma membrane. At this point, spermatids extend their pseudopod and become mobile. This process is calcium-dependent and a normal progression of this step requires ferlin's involvement.

Dysferlin is highly expressed in skeletal muscles, but is also found in heart, placenta, liver, lung, kidney and pancreas. Dysferlin is essential for membrane repair mechanism in muscle cells. Dysferlin in sea stars is 46.9% identical to human dysferlin, and is critical for normal endocytosis during oogenesis and embryogenesis. In humans, dysferlin's primary function is believed to be involvement in muscle membrane repair mechanism. Skeletal muscles experience micro-damages during exercising and daily activities. When muscles are damaged, dysferlin containing vesicles accumulate at the site of injury, and by fusing together and to the membrane, they patch the leakage. In dysferlin-null muscles, these vesicles still accumulate at the damage site, but they cannot fuse and therefore, are unable to repair the damaged muscle cells. Otoferlin is another ferlin member in humans and it plays a role in exocytosis of synaptic vesicles at the auditory inner hair cell ribbon synapse. In adult fruit flies, a ferlin member called misfire is expressed in testis and ovaries. Mutations in misfire and Fer-1, ferlins in flies and C. elegans, cause male sterility because of defects in fertilization.

Function of ferlin proteins involves employing multiple domains. C2A domains are specialized in lipid binding. The phospholipid interaction is often calcium dependent as C2 domains have evolved to respond to increase in calcium concentration. A sudden increase in calcium concentration is observed in synaptic vesicles or inside muscle cells after membrane damage. Therefore, C2 domains are often referred to as the calcium sensor of C2 domain-containing proteins. The function and mechanism of function of C2 domains is well-characterized, although it may vary between different C2 domains. In general, C2 domains interact with the membrane via electrostatic or hydrophobic interactions. It has been proposed that FerA may be involved in membrane interaction as well. It can in fact interact with neutral or negatively charged phospholipids and the interaction is enhanced in the presence of calcium ions. The molecular mechanism by which FerA interacts with the membrane or calcium ions however, is currently unknown.

== Disease association ==
The most important disease relevance of ferlins in humans is related to mutations in dysferlin. In humans, disease causing mutations in dysferlin have been identified in all C2 domains, FerA domain, DysF domain, and even linker segments. Lack of functional dysferlin causes a group of muscular dystrophies called dysferlinopathies. Dysferlinopathies include limb-girdle muscular dystrophy (LGMD) 2B, Miyoshi myopathy (MM) and distal myopathy of the anterior tibialis. C2A mutations which affect its calcium binding or lipid binding can often cause muscular dystrophy. Interestingly, dysferlin C2B does not bind calcium, however, mutations in this domain can still cause muscular dystrophy. Some mutations in C2A can disrupt dysferlin interaction with other important proteins involved in membrane repair process (such as MG53) which can also lead to muscular dystrophy. Many mutations in dysferlin occur in DysF domain which often disrupt Arginine/Tryptophan stacks of this domain. This leads to a less stable and possibly unfolded protein which may result in the degradation of the entire dysferlin. Several FerA mutations have been also identified. These mutations have been shown to lower the stability of FerA domains which may explain the pathogenicity of these mutations.

Otoferlin has been shown to interact with SNAREs and play a role in a calcium-dependent exocytosis in the hair cells in the inner ear. Mutations in otoferlin can cause mild to profound non-syndromic recessive hearing loss in humans.

Currently, there is no association between myoferlin mutations and human diseases. However, it has been shown experimentally that loss of myoferlin results in reduced myoblast fusion and muscle size. There is also a correlation between myoferlin overexpression and several types of cancers such as lung cancer and breast cancer. In pancreatic ductal adenocarcinoma (PDAC) myoferlin increases cell proliferation and promotes tumorigenesis and its expression negatively correlates with tumor size. Breast cancer patients with overexpressed myoferlin have a lower survival rate. Although it is not yet clear how myoferlin contributes in cancer pathology in a molecular level, there are scientific evidences that myoferlin overexpression is associated with tumor growth and metastasis. In fact, myoferlin depletion in cancer cell lines can result in reduced tumor size and metastasis rate.
