= CIMIP2C =

Protein-coding gene in humans

Identifiers
- Aliases: CIMIP2C, chromosome 2 open reading frame 70, family with sequence similarity 166 member C, C2orf70, FAM166C
- External IDs: MGI: 1922684; GeneCards: CIMIP2C

Gene location (Human)
Chr.	Chromosome 2 (human)
Band	2p23.3	Start	26,562,585 bp
Band	2p23.3	End	26,579,532 bp

Gene location (Mouse)
Chr.	Chromosome 5 (mouse)
Band	5|5 B1	Start	30,623,391 bp
Band	5|5 B1	End	30,641,432 bp
RNA expression pattern
Bgee	Human / Mouse (ortholog); Top expressed in: testicle; sperm; left testis; right testis; right uterine tube; tibialis anterior muscle; ventricular zone; olfactory zone of nasal mucosa; bronchial epithelial cell; hypothalamus / Top expressed in: seminiferous tubule; spermatid; otolith organ; utricle; Epithelium of choroid plexus; right lung lobe; vestibular sensory epithelium; spermatocyte; olfactory epithelium; left lung lobe; More reference expression data
BioGPS	n/a
Orthologs
Databases	NCBI: entry; OMA: entry
Species	Human	Mouse
Entrez	339778	75434
Ensembl	ENSG00000173557	ENSMUSG00000029182
UniProt	A6NJV1	Q9DAS2
RefSeq (mRNA)	NM_001105519; NM_001322426	NM_029285
RefSeq (protein)	NP_001098989; NP_001309355	NP_083561
Location (UCSC)	Chr 2: 26.56 – 26.58 Mb	Chr 5: 30.62 – 30.64 Mb
PubMed search
- Wikidata
View/Edit Human	View/Edit Mouse

Ciliary microtubule inner protein 2C, is a protein that in humans is encoded by the CIMIP2C gene (previously FAM166C). This protein is a microtubule inner protein which is involved in cilia movement.

== Gene ==
The FAM166C gene, also known as C2orf70, is located on the positive-sense strand of locus 2p23.3. It has 9 exons, however due to overlap only 4 are distinguishable in the human genome. FAM166C spans from 26,562,565 to 26,581,166 for a total length of 18.6 kpb.

=== Gene neighborhood ===
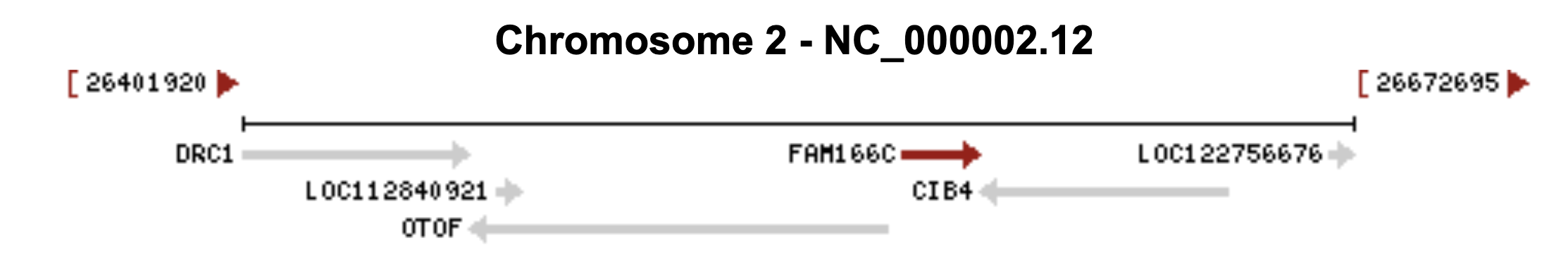
Gene neighborhood of FAM166C.

The gene neighborhood for FAM166C consists of DRC1, LOC112840921, OTOF, CIB4 and LOC122756675. LOC112840921 and LOC122756675 are both predicted transcriptional regulatory regions. DRC1 (dynein regulatory complex subunit 1) encodes a central component of the nexin-dynein complex, a regulator of ciliary diene. Mutations in this gene can lead to ciliary dyskinesia. OTOF encodes the protein otoferlin which has been suggested to be involved in vesicle membrane fusion. Mutations can lead to neurosensory nonsyndromic recessive deafness, DFNB9. CIB4 (Homo sapiens calcium and integrin binding family member 4) encodes the CIB4 protein which regulates integrin alphaIIb subunit activation.

=== Transcripts ===
FAM166C has 2 different transcript variants. The most abundant variant is FAM166C transcript variant 1, which is 718 nucleotides in length.

FAM166C Transcript variants
Accession Number	Transcript Length	Number of Exons	Protein Length	Isoform
NM_001105519.3	718	4	201	1
NM_001322426.2	754	5	184	2

== Protein ==
The FAM166C protein is 201 amino acids in length with a predicted molecular weight of 23 kDA and an isoelectric point of 10. It has higher than normal levels of tyrosine and proline and lower than normal levels of isoleucine.

=== Domains and structure ===
The FAM166C protein has one domain of unknown function called DUF2475 from amino acids 19–85. FAM166C isoform 1 secondary structure appears to be primarily alpha helical in nature with only short segments predicted to be beta sheets. Tertiary structure predictions shows 5 distinct alpha helices with high confidence.

=== Isoforms ===
FAM166C has 2 different splice isoforms. The most abundant isoform is FAM166C protein isoform 1 which is 201 amino acids in length.

FAM166C protein isoforms
Name	Transcript variant	Peptide length	Domains present
Isoform 1	1	201 aa	DUF275
Isoform 2	2	184 aa	DUF275

== Regulation ==
=== Gene level regulation ===
==== Promoter ====
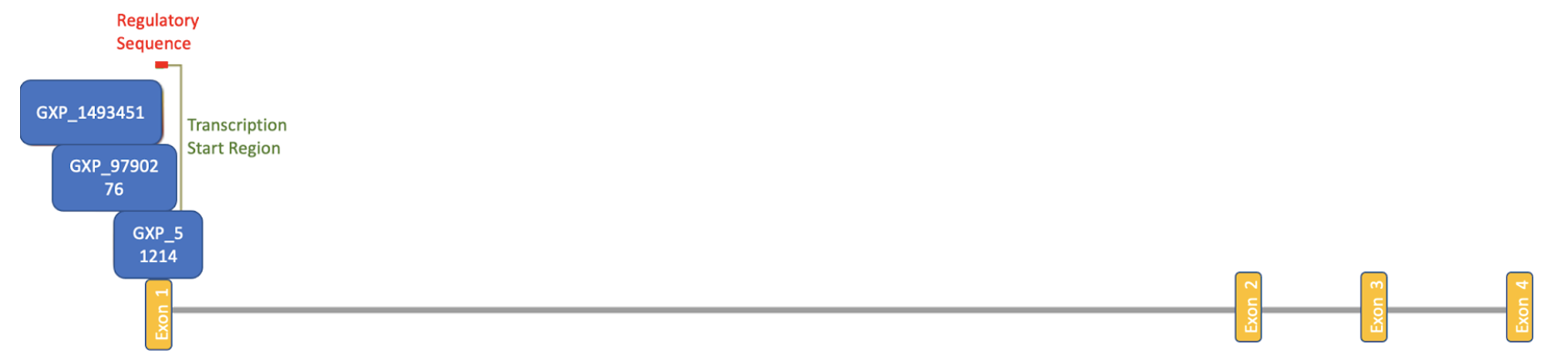
Bird's eye view of the coding region of the FAM166C gene and the promoters in the region. Blue boxes represent promoter regions while orange boxes represent exons.

FAM166C has 3 possible promoters that produce complete protein isoforms, however Isoform 1 is only encoded by GXP_1493451. Isoform 2 is also encoded by GXP_1493451.

==== Transcription factor binding sites ====
GXP_1493451 contains over 250 transcription factor binding sites. The most conserved and likely to bind include a forkhead box protein factor (V$FOXP2.01), a collagen krox domain factor (V$CKROX.01) and an E2F transcription factor(V$E2F3.01).

==== Expression pattern ====
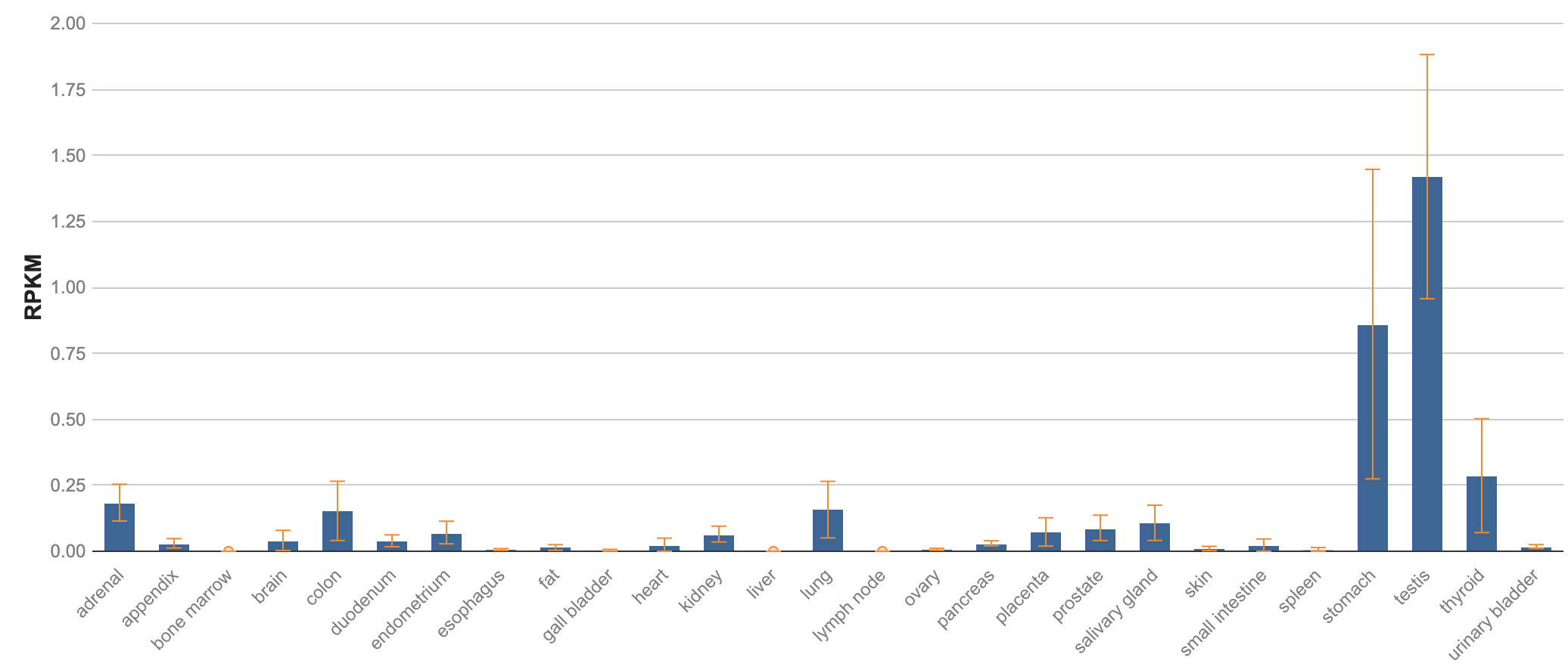
HPA RNA-seq normal tissue profiling for FAM166C

FAM166C has overall low levels of expression compared to other proteins but within the tissues it is expressed in, it appears most prominently in the testes, stomach and thyroid. Within the cell, FAM166C is localized to the nucleus and contains 2 nuclear localization signals. Protein antibody staining is highly indicative of nuclear membrane localization specifically.

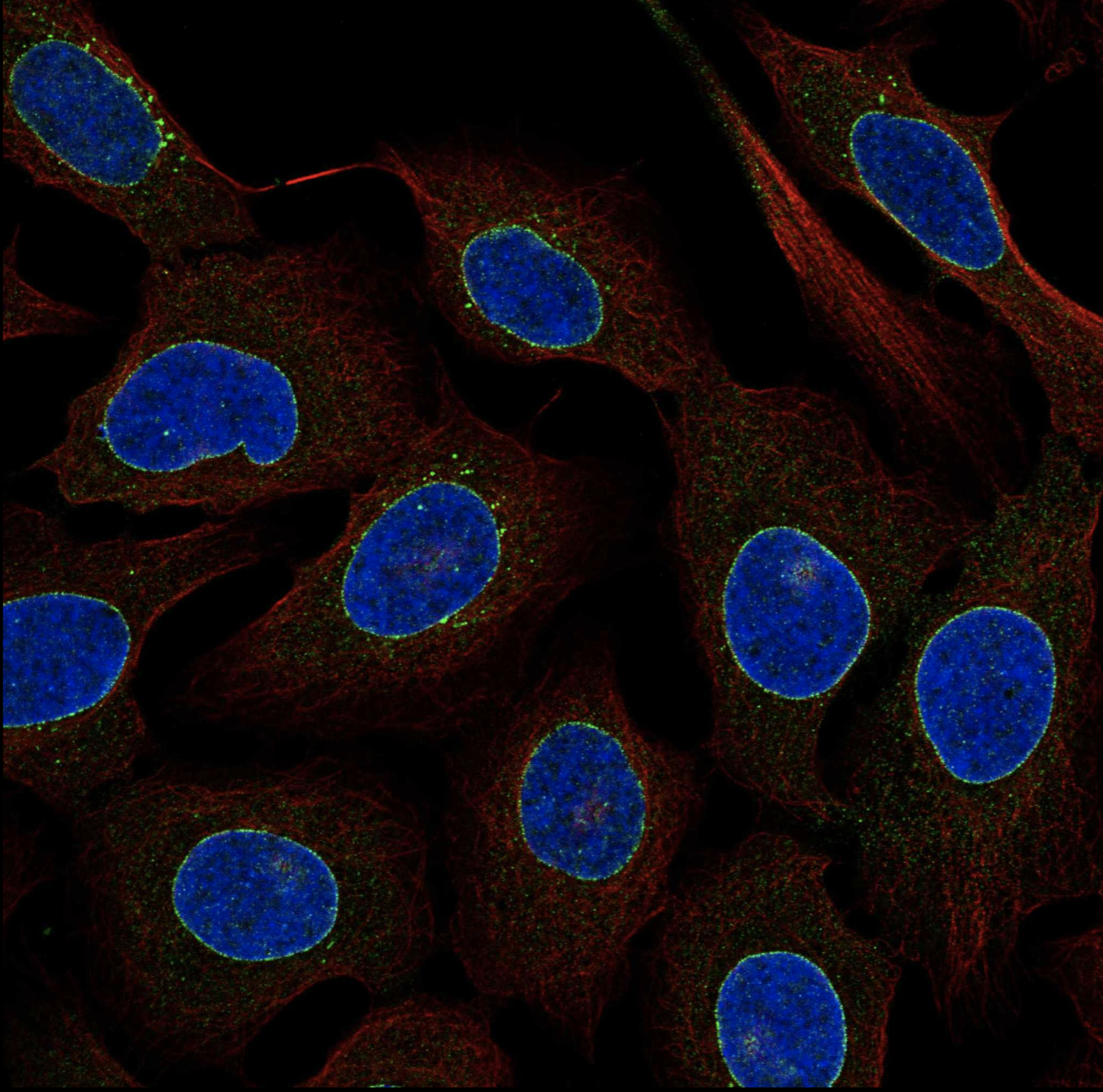
FAM166C protein antibody targeting reveals nuclear membrane localization. Green represents FAM166C antibodies, blue the nucleus, and red the microtubules.

=== Transcript level regulation ===
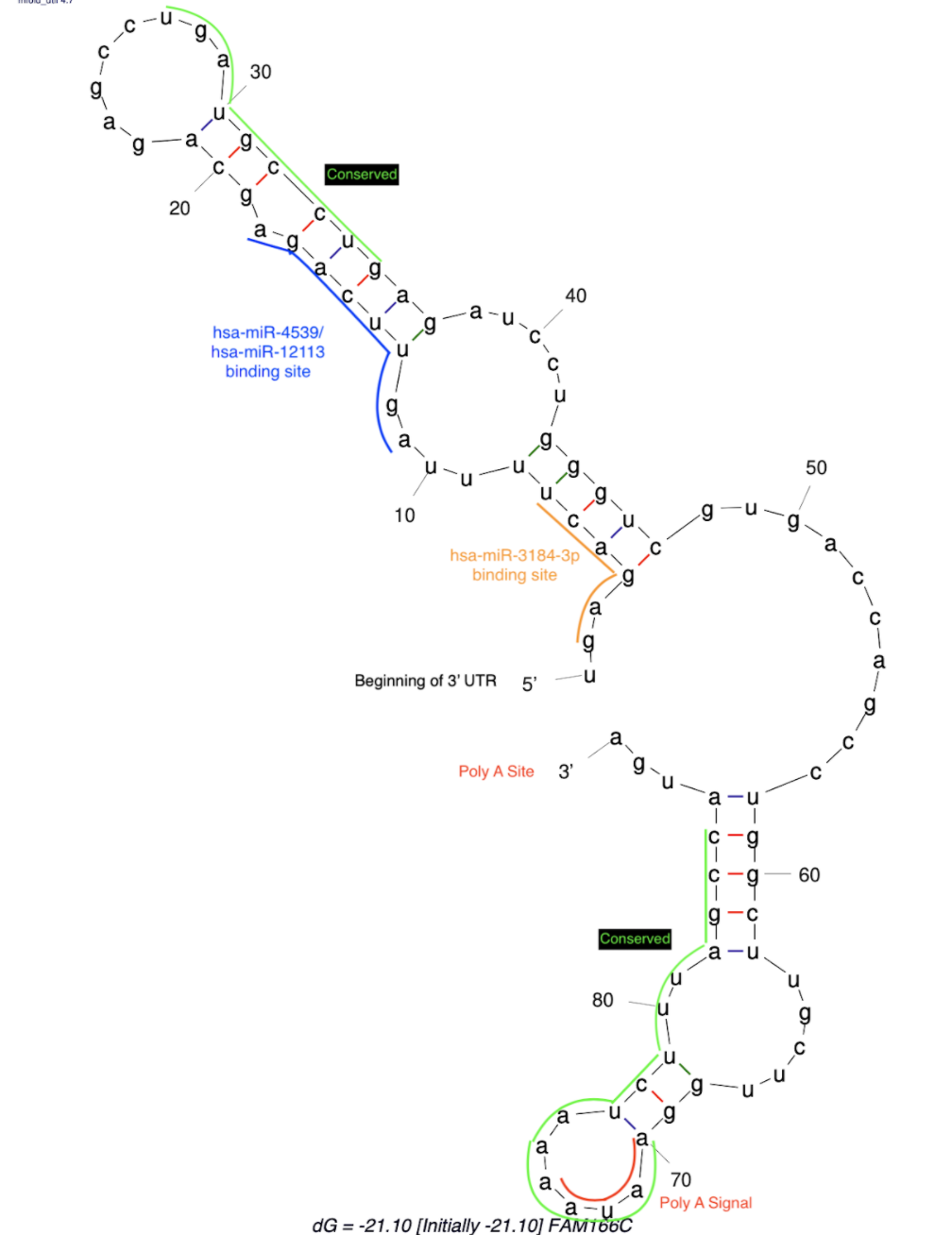
FAM166C 3' UTR structure predicted structure. Highly conserved region are shown in green. Potential mi-RNA binding sites are labelled in orange and blue, and polyadenylation sites are labeled in red.

The 5' UTR of FAM166C transcript variant 1 is 29 bp in length. Analysis of potential 3d structures identifies one hairpin structure, however, the 5' UTR differs heavily among orthologs indicating this is unlikely to be an important region for transcriptional regulation.

The 3' UTR is 89 bp in length and contains one polyadenylation signal at 699 bp. It is conserved among human transcript variants, but only small segments are well conserved among orthologs. It contains 2 predicted mi-RNA binding sites in areas of moderate conservation at 631 bp (has-miR-3184-3p) and at 641 bp (has-miR-4539, has-miR-12113). 3D predictions identify two stem loop structures.

=== Protein level regulation ===
FAM166C is predicted to have 7 phosphorylation sites, 2 acetylation sites and one O-GlcNAc site, which are well conserved among orthologs.

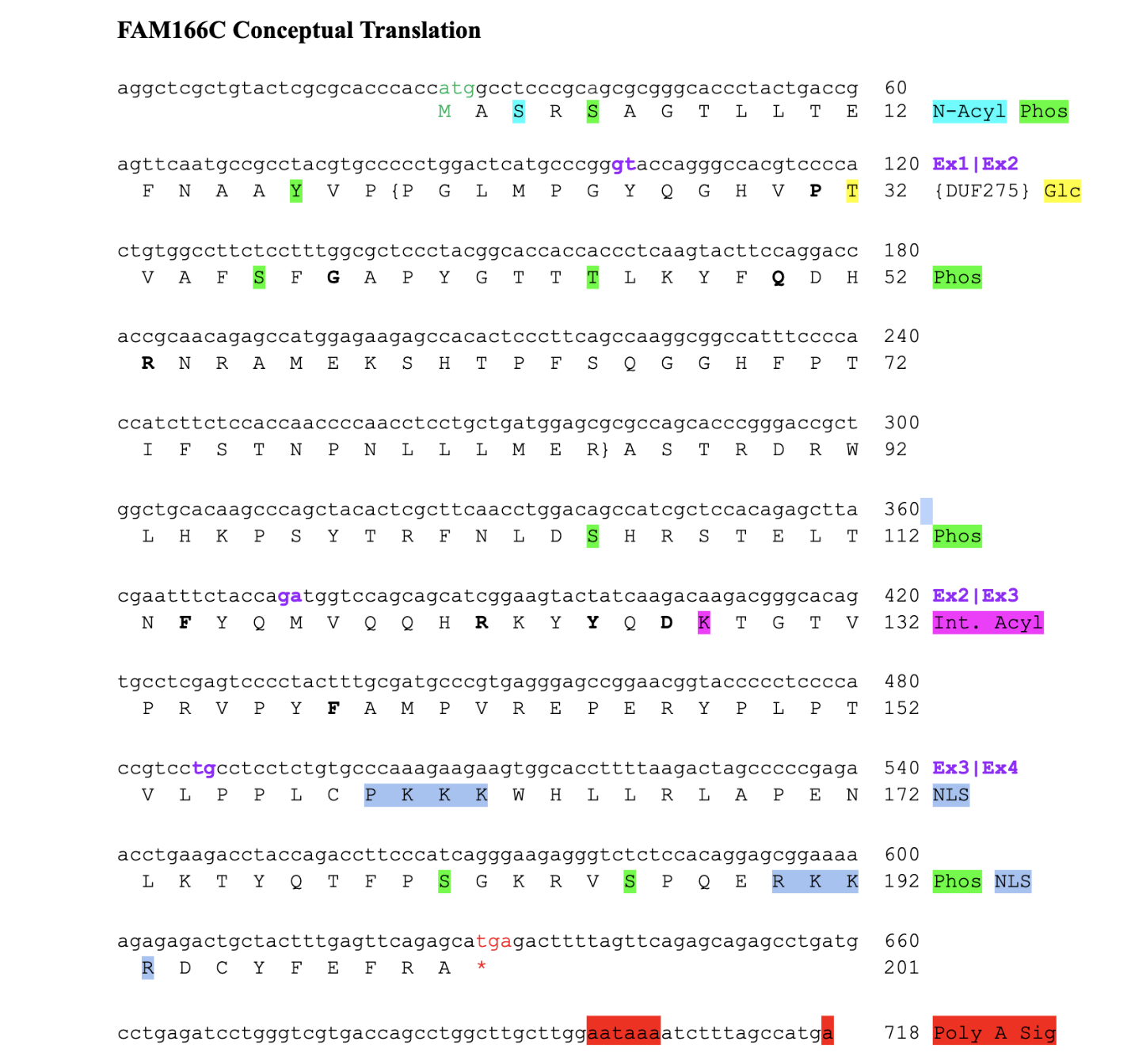

The above image is a conceptual translation of FAM166C transcript variant 1/ protein isoform 1. Phosphorylation sites are highlighted in green, N-linked acetylation sites are highlighted in indigo, internal acetylation sites are highlighted in pink, O-ß-GlcNAc sites are highlighted in yellow, nuclear localization signals are highlighted in light blue and the poly A signal is highlighted in red. The start and stop of transcription are marked with colored green and red text respectively. DUF275 is marked with brackets and amino acids conserved among all known orthologs are bolded.

== Homology and evolution ==
=== Paralogs ===
The human FAM166C gene has two paralogs called FAM166A and FAM166B. They are located at 9q34.3 and 9p13.3 respectively. The function of both proteins is not currently well understood.

=== Orthologs ===
FAM166C has orthologs in species as distant as insects. Mammalian orthologs are moderately similar to human FAM166C, with percent identity greater than 70%. Orthologs in reptiles, birds and amphibians range from 65% to 40%. In fish and invertebrates, identity ranges from 40% to 20%. No orthologs were found in fungi, bacteria or plants.

	Genus/Species	Common name	Taxonomic Order	Estimated Date of Divergence (MYA)	Accession number	Sequence length (aa)	Sequence identity (%)	Sequence similarity (%)
Mammalia	Homo sapiens	Human	Primates	0	NP_001098989.1	201	100	100
	Mus musculus	Mouse	Rodentia	90	NP_083561.1	200	68.2	80.6
	Canis Lupis familiaris	Dog	Carnivora	96	XP_038546893.1	201	78.6	90
	Camelus ferus	Wild Bactrian camel	Artiodactyla	96	XP_006189760.1	201	82.1	89.1
Reptilia	Podarcis muralis	Common wall lizard	Squamata	312	XP_028581109.1	201	66.2	80.1
	Thamnophis elegans	Western terrestrial garter snake	Squamata	312	XP_032071055.1	201	65.7	79.6
	Gopherus evgoodei	Goode's thornscrub tortoise	Testudines	312	XP_030410948.	201	64.7	78.1
Aves	Gallus gallus	Chicken	Galliformes	312	XP_420014.2	128	58.5	76.4
	Apteryx rowi	Okarito brown kiwi	Apterygiformes	312	XP_025911147.1	199	40.8	52.9
Amphibia	Ranitomeya imitator	Mimic poison frog	Anura	351.8	CAF5191195.	200	67.2	80.6
	Bufo bufo	Common toad	Anura	351.8	XP_040286881.1	155	51	71
	Microcaecilia unicolor	Tiny cayenne caecilian	Gymnophiona	351.8	XP_030051403.1	173	46.8	69.3
	Geotrypetes seraphini	Gaboon caecilian	Gymnophiona	351.8	XP_033791776.1	173	49.0	67.9
Fish	Alosa sapidissima	American shad	Clupeiformes	435	XP_041950360.1	201	41.1	62.4
	Salmo trutta	Brown trout	Salmoniformes	435	XP_029626333.1	192	4.21	60.9
	Carcharodon carcharias	Great white shark	Chondrichthyes	473	XP_041043370.1	200	41.0	60.8
Invertebrata	Ciona intestinalis	Vase tunicate	Enterogona	676	XP_002130039.1	206	43.9	62.3
	Anneissia japonica	Sea lily	Crinoidea	684	XP_033123630.1	203	38.9	58.8
	Saccoglossus kowalevskii	Acorn worm	Enteropneusta	684	XP_002733424.1	197	41.5	58.5
	Photinus pyralis	Common eastern firefly	Coleoptera	797	XP_031329322.1	200	23.7	39.9

=== Evolution ===
The FAM166C gene appears most distantly in insects which diverged from humans approximately 797 million years ago. Orthologs of FAM166A and FAM166B also occur in insects. FAM166C evolves at a moderate rate; a 1% change in amino acid sequence required around 10 million years. Based on sequence similarity of orthologs, FAM166C evolves at a rate in the middle of cytochrome c and fibrinogen alpha.

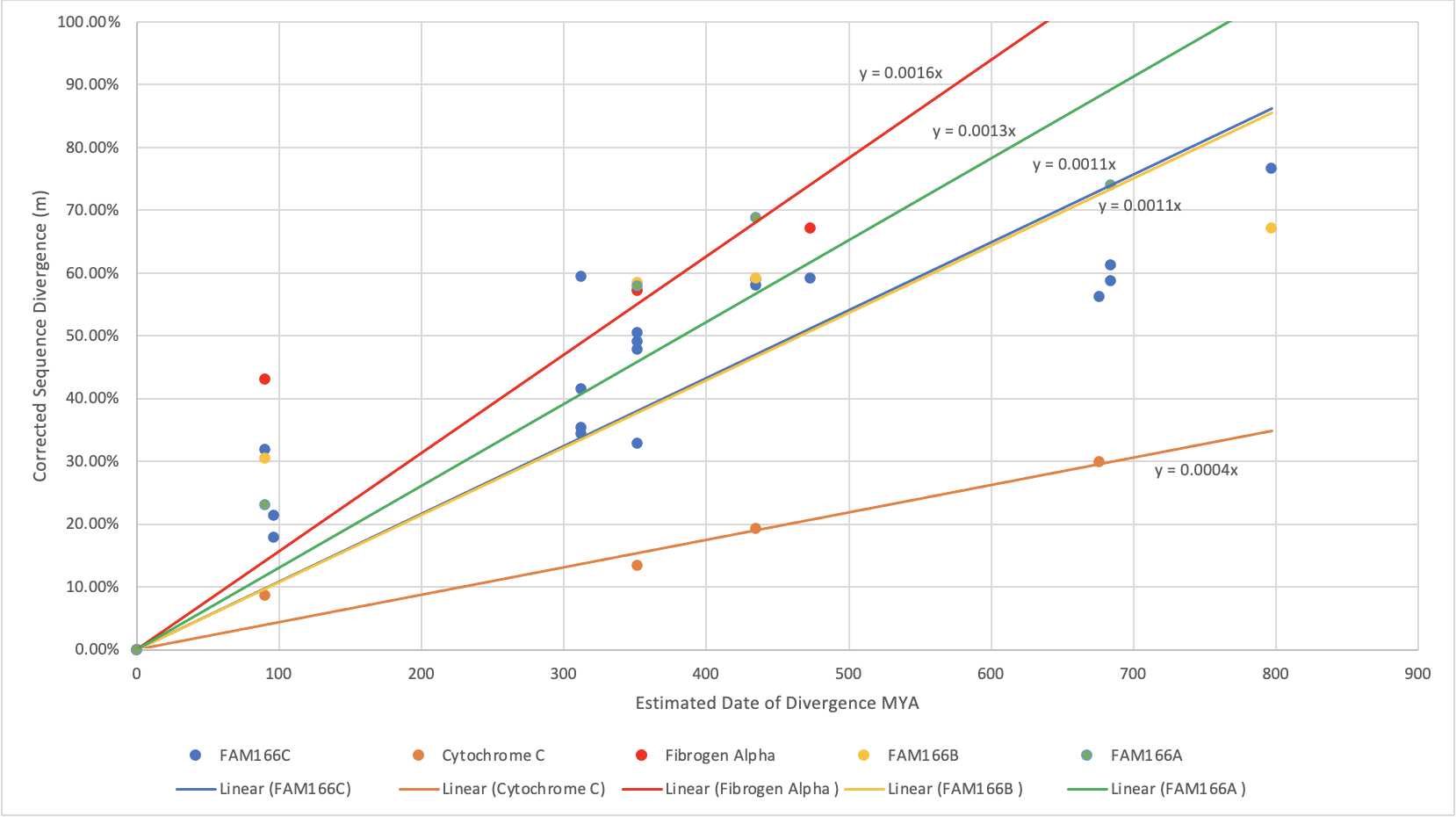
Rate of evolution comparison between FAM166C, FAM166B, FAM166C, Cytochrome C, and Fibrinogen Alpha A. FAM166C appears to evolve at an average rate somewhere in the middle of Cytochrome C and Fibrinogen A.

== Clinical significance ==
=== Disease association ===
==== Colorectal cancer ====
Several studies have evaluated FAM166C as a potential target for colorectal cancer treatment. In one study, researchers evaluated FAM166C for drug treatment viability for G12A colorectal cancer. FAM166C was one of 11 genes that had a significantly different twofold change between KRAS G12 (mutated oncogene suppressor) colorectal cancer patients and wild type colorectal cancer patients. Another study identified FAM166C as one of four potential targets for CVB-D, an autophagy cell death inducer of colorectal cancer cells, based on its over-expression in colon adenocarcinoma.

=== Mutations (SNPs of interest) ===
Using GWAS, a FAM166C SNP was identified as being correlated with high levels of bacterial colonization, a trait that may be associated with periodontitis.

Using whole exome sequencing and the human reference genome as a comparison, a novel FAM166C SNP was identified as the only gene mutation having a polyphen score of 0.954 indicating it was likely deleterious and may be involved in one of the patient's bilateral cleft lip and palate.
