= MDCC =

MDCC may refer to:

- Mississippi Delta Community College
- Muscular Dystrophy Coordinating Committee: see Muscular Dystrophy Community Assistance Research and Education Amendments of 2001#MDCC
- MDCC, Roman numerals for the year 1700
