= Otoferlin =

OTOF

Identifiers
- Aliases: OTOF, AUNB1, DFNB6, DFNB9, FER1L2, NSRD9, otoferlin
- External IDs: OMIM: 603681; MGI: 1891247; GeneCards: OTOF

Gene location (Human)
Chr.	Chromosome 2 (human)
Band	2p23.3	Start	26,457,203 bp
Band	2p23.3	End	26,558,756 bp

Gene location (Mouse)
Chr.	Chromosome 5 (mouse)
Band	5|5 B1	Start	30,524,406 bp
Band	5|5 B1	End	30,619,276 bp
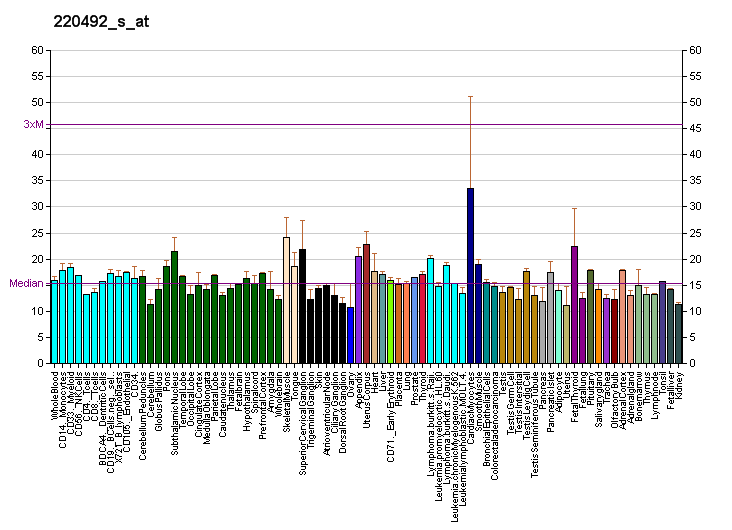
RNA expression pattern
Bgee	Human / Mouse (ortholog); Top expressed in: nucleus accumbens; putamen; caudate nucleus; granulocyte; hypothalamus; gonad; temporal lobe; amygdala; prefrontal cortex; ventricular zone / Top expressed in: vestibular sensory epithelium; utricle; olfactory tubercle; lumbar subsegment of spinal cord; vestibular membrane of cochlear duct; molar; superior frontal gyrus; primary visual cortex; neuron; gray matter layer of cerebellum; More reference expression data
BioGPS	More reference expression data
Gene ontology
Molecular function	calcium ion binding; molecular function
Cellular component	integral component of membrane; cytosol; cell junction; plasma membrane; basolateral plasma membrane; synapse; synaptic vesicle membrane; endoplasmic reticulum membrane; endoplasmic reticulum; membrane; cytoplasmic vesicle
Biological process	membrane fusion; hearing; synaptic vesicle exocytosis
Sources:Amigo / QuickGO
Orthologs
Databases	NCBI: entry; OMA: entry
Species	Human	Mouse
Entrez	9381	83762
Ensembl	ENSG00000115155	ENSMUSG00000062372
UniProt	Q9HC10	Q9ESF1
RefSeq (mRNA)	NM_001287489; NM_004802; NM_194248; NM_194322; NM_194323	NM_001100395; NM_001286421; NM_031875; NM_001313767
RefSeq (protein)	NP_001274418; NP_004793; NP_919224; NP_919303; NP_919304	NP_001093865; NP_001273350; NP_001300696; NP_114081
Location (UCSC)	Chr 2: 26.46 – 26.56 Mb	Chr 5: 30.52 – 30.62 Mb
PubMed search
- Wikidata
View/Edit Human	View/Edit Mouse

Otoferlin is a protein that in humans is encoded by the OTOF gene.

== Function ==
There are two forms of otoferlin protein. The short form of the protein has three C2 domains and a single carboxy-terminal transmembrane domain found also in the C. elegans spermatogenesis factor FER-1 and human dysferlin. The long form has six C2 domains.

Dysferlin and myoferlin are proteins found in humans that are homologous to otoferlin. Both dysferlin and myoferlin have seven C2 domains. A C2 domain is a protein structural domain involved in targeting proteins to cell membranes.

C2A in otoferlin's longer form, with six C2 domains, is structurally similar to dysferlin C2A. However, loop 1 in the calcium (Ca^{2+}) binding site of otoferlin C2A is significantly shorter than the homologous loop in dysferlin and myoferlin C2A domains. Therefore, it is unable to bind to calcium. Otoferlin C2A is also unable to bind to phospholipids and hence it is structurally and functionally distinct from other C2 domains. Nonetheless, the homology suggests that this protein may be involved in vesicle membrane fusion.

Similar to dysferlin and myoferlin, otoferlin has a FerA domain and its FerA domain has been shown to interact with zwitterionic lipids in a calcium-dependent manner and with negatively charged lipids in a calcium-independent manner. The estimated charge of the FerA domain among ferlin proteins varies significantly. At pH 7, the estimated charge of dysferlin is -8.4 while otoferlin FerA is +8.5. Several transcript variants encoding multiple isoforms have been found for this gene.

== Clinical significance ==
Mutations in the gene encoding otoferlin are the cause of nonsyndromic recessive deafness type 9.

Gene therapies for restoring the defective Otoferlin using an adeno-associated virus (AAVs) have been under development for some time, including AAVAnc80-hOTOF used in experimental gene therapy in humans. A successful application of the therapy in Britain was announced in May 2024. Lunsotogene parvec-cwha is a therapy approved for use in the United States.
