= ADSS1 =

Protein-coding gene in humans

Identifiers
- Aliases: ADSS1, adenylosuccinate synthase like 1, MPD5, adenylosuccinate synthase 1, ADSSL1
- External IDs: OMIM: 612498; MGI: 87947; GeneCards: ADSS1
Available structures
PDB	Ortholog search: PDBe RCSB
PDB	List of PDB id codes 2GJO
Enzyme activity
EC #	BRENDA	ExPASy	KEGG	MetaCyc
6.3.4.4	↗	↗	↗	↗

Gene location (Human)
Chr.	Chromosome 14 (human)
Band	14q32.33	Start	104,724,229 bp
Band	14q32.33	End	104,747,325 bp

Gene location (Mouse)
Chr.	Chromosome 12 (mouse)
Band	12|12 F1	Start	112,586,479 bp
Band	12|12 F1	End	112,607,794 bp
RNA expression pattern
Bgee	Human / Mouse (ortholog); Top expressed in: vastus lateralis muscle; Skeletal muscle tissue of rectus abdominis; tibialis anterior muscle; biceps brachii; Skeletal muscle tissue of biceps brachii; muscle of thigh; deltoid muscle; gastrocnemius muscle; body of tongue; myocardium of left ventricle / Top expressed in: triceps brachii muscle; muscle of thigh; ankle; extensor digitorum longus muscle; sternocleidomastoid muscle; vastus lateralis muscle; temporal muscle; gastrocnemius muscle; plantaris muscle; digastric muscle; More reference expression data
BioGPS	n/a
Gene ontology
Molecular function	phosphate ion binding; nucleotide binding; protein homodimerization activity; GTP binding; metal ion binding; actin filament binding; ligase activity; GTPase activity; adenylosuccinate synthase activity; magnesium ion binding
Cellular component	cytoplasm; cytosol
Biological process	purine nucleotide biosynthetic process; aspartate metabolic process; immune system process; 'de novo' AMP biosynthetic process; glutamine metabolic process; purine ribonucleoside monophosphate biosynthetic process; response to starvation; IMP metabolic process; AMP biosynthetic process; purine nucleotide metabolic process; response to muscle activity; cellular response to electrical stimulus
Sources:Amigo / QuickGO
Orthologs
Databases	NCBI: entry; OMA: entry
Species	Human	Mouse
Entrez	122622	11565
Ensembl	ENSG00000185100	ENSMUSG00000011148
UniProt	Q8N142	P28650
RefSeq (mRNA)	NM_152328; NM_199165; NM_001320424	NM_007421
RefSeq (protein)	NP_001307353; NP_689541; NP_954634	NP_031447
Location (UCSC)	Chr 14: 104.72 – 104.75 Mb	Chr 12: 112.59 – 112.61 Mb
PubMed search
- Wikidata
View/Edit Human	View/Edit Mouse

Adenylosuccinate synthase like 1 is a protein that in humans is encoded by the ADSS1 gene (previously ADSSL1).

== Function ==
This gene encodes a member of the adenylosuccinate synthase family of proteins. The encoded muscle-specific enzyme plays a role in the purine nucleotide cycle by catalyzing the first step in the conversion of inosine monophosphate (IMP) to adenosine monophosphate (AMP). Mutations in this gene may cause adolescent onset distal myopathy. Alternative splicing results in multiple transcript variants. [provided by RefSeq, Feb 2016].

Currently there is no treatment for the distal myopathy caused by the mutation in ADSSL1 gene. However, a non-profit foundation (Cure-ADSSL1.org) is currently working with a team of researchers to find a cure. Refer to the link below to find more information about this foundation.
