= Muscular Dystrophy Association =

American nonprofit organization

- Abbreviation: MDA
- Formation: June 1950; 76 years ago
- Founder: Paul Cohen
- Founded at: New York City, U.S.
- Type: non-profit
- Tax ID no.: 13-1665552
- Purpose: "to save and improve the lives of kids and adults with muscular dystrophy, amyotrophic lateral sclerosis (ALS), spinal muscular atrophy (SMA) and other related diseases."
- Location: Chicago, Illinois, U.S.
- Region served: United States
- Key people: Sharon Hesterlee, PhD (President and CEO): Former Governor Brad Henry (Chairman); Sharon Hesterlee, Ph.D. (Chief Research Officer)
- Revenue: $63.7 million (in 2020)
- Website: www.mda.org

The Muscular Dystrophy Association (MDA) is an American nonprofit organization dedicated to supporting people living with muscular dystrophy, ALS, and related neuromuscular diseases. The organization was founded in 1950 by Paul Cohen, who lived with facioscapulohumeral muscular dystrophy (FSHD). MDA accelerates research, advances care, and works to empower families to live longer and more independent lives. MDA is also known for its working relationship with comedian and actor Jerry Lewis and his annual Labor Day telethon, broadcast live from 1966 to 2010, starting Sunday evening and continuing into Monday evening. The organization's headquarters is in Chicago, Illinois.

== History ==
The MDA was founded in 1950 by a group with personal connections to muscular dystrophy, including Paul Cohen who lived with Facioscapulohumeral muscular dystrophy (FSHD). Originally known as the Muscular Dystrophy Associations of America, it was renamed to its present name in the 1970s.

In 1954, MDA began its partnership with the International Association of Fire Fighters for its annual Fill the Boot fundraising drive. In 1955, the organization held its first summer camp.

In 1980, American motorcycle manufacturer Harley Davidson became an MDA National Sponsor. In 1986, oil and gas provider Citgo became a second national sponsor of the organization. In 1987 the MDA Ride For Life program began, a fundraising motorcycle ride held over Labor Day weekend.

In 1982, the MDA Shamrocks program launched in Grand Rapids, Michigan, and became a national program one year later. In 1996, MDA and Lewis were jointly honored by the American Medical Association with a lifetime achievement awards for their contributions to the health and welfare of humanity.

Dr. Stanley Appel established Houston Methodist Hospital's amyotrophic lateral sclerosis clinic with MDA in 1982, which has evolved into the MDA ALS Research and Clinical Center at the Houston Methodist Neurological Institute. Dr. Appel's pioneering work includes the development of an immunotherapy treatment that may slow the progression of ALS. Dr. Appel's efforts were recognized by the MDA when he received the MDA's Tribute Award in 2022.

In October 2020, the MDA Telethon, which had originally run from 1966 to 2014, was reimagined as The MDA Kevin Hart Kids Telethon after a six-year hiatus. The two-hour event was held virtually due to the COVID-19 pandemic, and streamed live on the Laugh Out Loud network and its YouTube channel. Celebrity guests for the 2020 telethon included Jack Black, Josh Gad, Michael B. Jordan, and Jillian Mercado.

In November 2020, MDA launched a tool, called the neuroMuscular ObserVational Research (MOVR) Visualization and Reporting Platform (VRP), to help make clinical data more accessible and accelerate the discovery of muscular dystrophy treatments.

In response to the COVID-19 pandemic, MDA converted several of its traditional programs to virtual formats and introduced new virtual programming. The latter included several Facebook Live events discussing challenges that the pandemic placed on people with disabilities. It also provided COVID-19 resources and recommendations for neuromuscular patients and providers via its online resource center. Throughout stay at home orders due to the COVID-19 pandemic, MDA shared a "joke of the day" from National Ambassador Ethan Lybrand via their social media channels.

In January 2021, MDA announced NFL running back Nyheim Hines as its national spokesperson.

In March 2025, marking its 75th year, the association held its annual Clinical & Scientific Conference in Dallas, where discussions focused on legislative advocacy regarding air travel accessibility, disability rights, and the completion of universal newborn screening for Spinal Muscular Atrophy (SMA) in the U.S.

In May 2025, Donald S. Wood, PhD, retired from the Muscular Dystrophy Association (MDA). Dr. Wood previously served as Vice Chair of the Board of Directors from 2017 to 2020 before becoming President. Sharon Hesterlee, PhD, who served as Chief Research Officer for the organization, was appointed President and CEO.

=== National Ambassador ===
MDA has a tradition of selecting National Ambassadors who are people living with neuromuscular disease. Since the program's inception in 1952, over 45 National Ambassadors have shared their experiences to emphasize the need for funding research and developing treatments and cures for neuromuscular diseases. These representatives engage with partners, volunteers, supporters, and notable figures, gaining exposure through social media channels and national media outlets. Former youth ambassadors have pursued diverse fields in adulthood, advocating for improvements in accessibility, early intervention treatments through newborn screening, and advancements in research and care for MDA families and individuals living with disabilities. MDA's National Ambassadors were formerly known as "National Goodwill Ambassadors", which, until the 1980s, were referred to as "poster children". In 1952, the MDA inaugurated Michael Danna as its first Poster Child.

One of the most well-known ambassadors was Mattie Stepanek, the National Goodwill Ambassador from 2002 until his death in 2004, notable for his best-selling Heartsongs series of poetry books, and his appearances on The Oprah Winfrey Show and Good Morning America. Another notable ambassador is Ethan LyBrand, who has Duchenne muscular dystrophy and gained national recognition for his Shorty Award-winning "Joke-A-Day for MDA" campaign during the COVID-19 pandemic.

=== Research ===
In 1986, MDA-funded researcher Louis M. Kunkel identified the dystrophin gene, the gene for Duchenne muscular dystrophy (DMD) and Becker muscular dystrophy (BMD). MDA funded the first gene therapy trial in 1999, followed by the first vector-based gene therapy trial for DMD in 2006.

In 2007, MDA funded Adrian R. Krainer and his colleagues at the Cold Spring Harbor Laboratory in Laurel Hollow, New York for the early-stage development of nusinersen. Nusinersen became FDA approved in 2016 as the first treatment for spinal muscular dystrophy (SMA).

As of 2018, MDA had a total funding commitment of more than $58 million distributed among 312 research grants. By 2019, MDA supported 252 research projects worldwide, totaling a funding commitment of more than $66 million.

MDA is actively involved in supporting the development of gene therapies for rare neuromuscular diseases. In 2023, the association introduced the Kickstart Program to lower the barriers to gene therapy development. The program assembles a team of experts to collaboratively assist selected projects, positioning them for follow-on grant funding. The Kickstart Program was presented at the 2023 MDA Clinical & Scientific Conference, where discussions focused on opportunities to de-risk gene therapies, current barriers to development, collaborative frameworks, and data management.

MDA supported the FDA's decision in 2023 to approve an experimental gene therapy developed by Sarepta Therapeutics that aims to slow the progression of Duchenne muscular dystrophy by facilitating the production of a protein called micro-dystrophin in patients' muscles. Advancements in Duchenne muscular dystrophy treatment have prompted MDA to lobby for newborn screening panels for early detection and treatment initiation.

== Programs and events ==
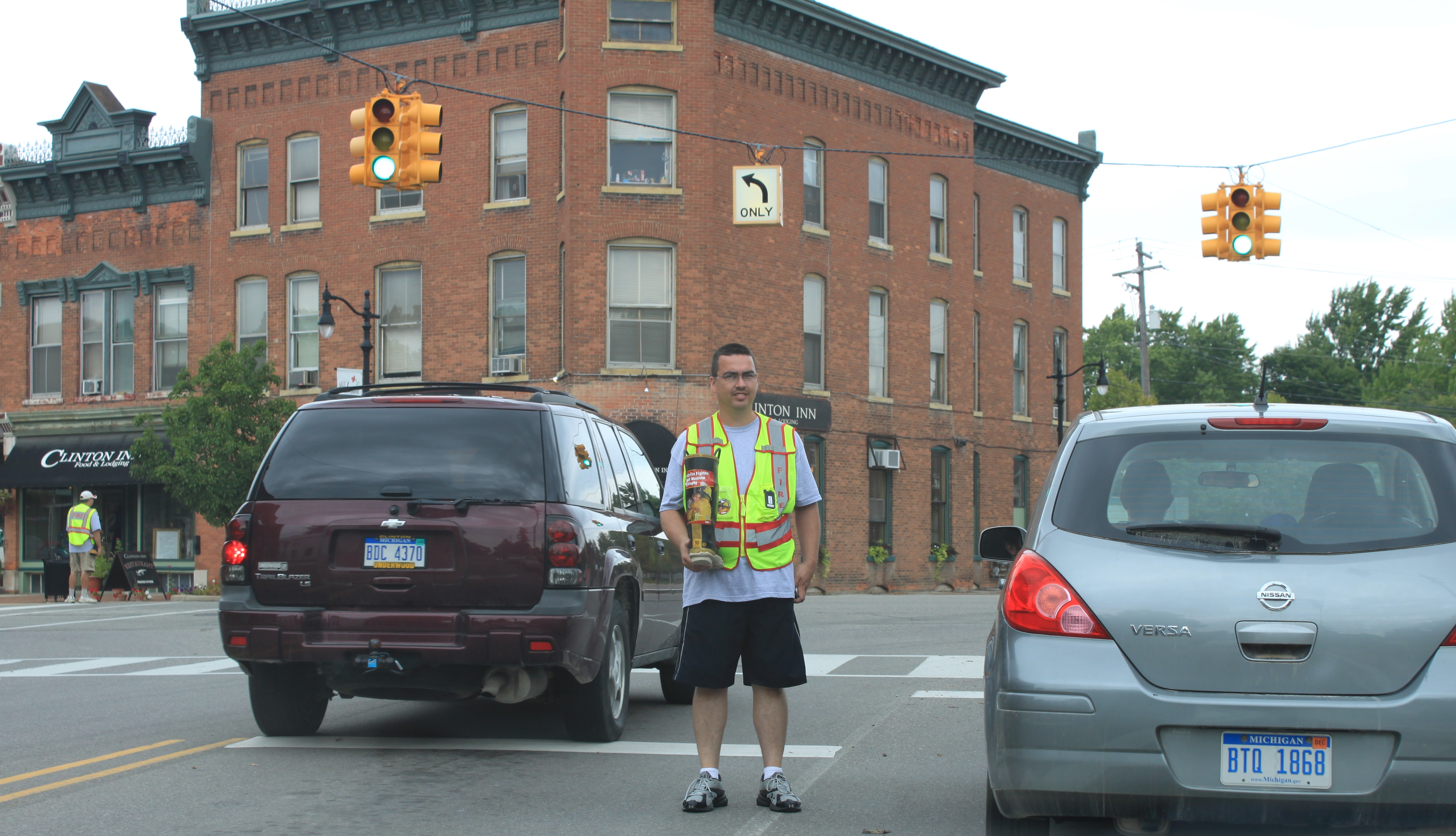
Fire fighters raising money for MDA as part of the Fill the Boot Drive in Clinton, Michigan

=== Fill the Boot Drive ===
During National Boot Day, the MDA partners with the International Association of Fire Fighters (IAFF) to launch Fill the Boot fundraising events. These events help support research, care, and advocacy for families affected by muscular dystrophy, ALS, and related neuromuscular diseases in the United States. The partnership between MDA and IAFF dates back to 1954, with IAFF designating MDA as its charity of choice. Firefighters across the country have raised $690 million over nearly seven decades, leading to breakthroughs in research, FDA-approved treatments, and advocacy efforts such as access to care and newborn screening.

MDA's annual payments to IAFF, which ranged from $980,000 to $1.4 million between 2015 and 2020 according to U.S. Department of Labor filings, received some scrutiny for their size relative to the charity's expenditures.

=== Telethon ===
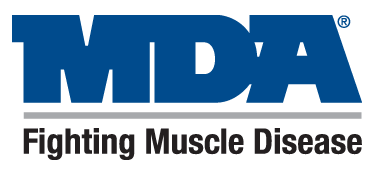
Official MDA logo used until January 29, 2016

Debuting in 1966 and held annually on Labor Day weekend until 2014, the telethon was originally hosted by veteran film star, comedian and singer Jerry Lewis, who also served as the MDA's national chairman since its inception in 1950 and hosted the show until 2010.

In 2005, the MDA made the unprecedented decision to pledge $1 million of the telethon's money raised to Hurricane Katrina disaster relief, making the donation specifically to the Salvation Army. The telethon also urged viewers to give to the American Red Cross.

In 2008, the annual televised fundraiser raised a record US$65,000,000.

Originally broadcast for up to 21½ hours from 1966 to 2010, the event was cut back to six hours in 2011. The 2011 edition of the telethon was originally announced to have been Lewis' last as host, with him continuing his role as national chairman; however, on August 3, 2011, the MDA announced that Lewis resigned as host and chairman, due to circumstances not revealed. However, in 2016, one year before his death, Lewis broke a five-year silence in a video endorsing MDA's redesigned web site and brand, declaring that the work to end muscular dystrophy be continued.

Additionally, Lewis' support was so ironclad over the years that children and adults assisted by MDA are referred to as Jerry's Kids. From 2012 to 2014, the show was known as the MDA Show of Strength. In early 2015, the organization announced it was discontinuing the show.

On September 9, 2020, MDA executives announced plans to relaunch their annual MDA telethon with a new host, comedian Kevin Hart. Entitled The MDA Kevin Hart Kids Telethon, the new two-hour telethon was seen exclusively through participating social media platforms; the event was broadcast October 24, 2020, at 8 p.m. EDT. The special was a dual-charity event, with proceeds going towards both MDA and "Help From The Hart", an organization founded by the aforementioned new host of the program. Hart's charity announced that it will use its portion of funds raised to "support education, health, and social needs programs targeting underserved communities and servicing youth through education scholarships." The telethon was accompanied by a 10-hour Let's Play livestream, called Let's Play For A Cure, which featured DJ and producer Zedd, gaming personality missharvey and esports athletes. The live stream was part of a week-long "streamathon", which featured esports stars playing games including League of Legends, Rocket League, Fortnite, Call of Duty and Fall Guys.

Following the Kevin Hart Kids Telethon was MDA's 70th Anniversary Show, hosted by entertainment TV journalists Nancy O'Dell and Jann Carl.

=== MDA Clinical & Scientific Conference ===
The MDA Clinical & Scientific Conference is a prominent event that gathers over 2,000 professionals, including scientists and clinicians, specializing in neuromuscular diseases. The conference showcases research, fosters collaborations, and promotes the latest advancements in the field. It covers various aspects of research, from pre-clinical to clinical, and supports the development of improved care and treatment for the neuromuscular community. The conference also hosts the Annual Insights in Research Investment Summit, which focuses on research and investment stakeholders in neuromuscular diseases. The 2023 conference featured a keynote address by Dr. Peter Marks, director of the FDA's Center for Biologics Evaluation and Research, on the growing impact of gene therapies in treating rare disorders.

=== Quest Media ===
MDA publishes a quarterly magazine, Quest, catering to people with neuromuscular diseases and their caretakers. Mindy Henderson, diagnosed with type 2 spinal muscular atrophy (SMA) and a patient advocate, is the editor-in-chief as of 2023 and MDA’s Vice President of Disability Outreach & Empowerment. The magazine, with a circulation of around 100,000, extends its reach through distribution at neurologists' offices and the MDA's network of 150 care centers across the country. Besides focusing on science and research, Quest's coverage includes adaptive lifestyles, travel, medical equipment, accessible fashion, employment, and media representation.

=== MDA Summer Camp ===
Every summer, for one week, thousands of children from across the country who have been diagnosed with neuromuscular diseases are able to attend a camp designated for only them. MDA Summer Camp offers children and young adults the opportunity to participate in recreational activities that foster independence, self-confidence, skill development, and friendships. There is a one counselor to one camper ratio and the entire week the children, ages 8–17, are paired with an adult volunteer. They participate in activities and games and stay overnight. The camps are set up locally and are different weeks throughout May through August. The entire camp staff are volunteer members and are required to interview and apply with good recommendations. The camp is offered at no cost to campers and their families; the cost of the camp for the campers and volunteers is covered by the many fundraisers the MDA does each year.

Official MDA Muscle Walk logo since 2016

=== Muscle Walk ===
Started in 2010, the MDA Muscle Walk is an annual 1 to 3.1-mile lap event held in over 150 communities across the United States to raise money for research and patient services. In 2022, MDA resumed in-person Muscle Walks in numerous locations, including Phoenix, Chicago, St. Louis, Detroit, Boston, Twin Cities, Houston, and Dallas, while continuing to offer a virtual Muscle Walk option to enhance participation flexibility.

=== Shamrocks retail fundraising campaign ===
Throughout February and March, retailers across the US contributed to the MDA Shamrocks campaign, the largest St. Patrick's Day fundraising initiative in the country. They provide customers with the opportunity to either round up their purchases or donate a specific amount, such as $1, $3, or $5. Customers can write their names on paper shamrocks, which are then displayed in stores to show support for MDA's mission to empower people with neuromuscular diseases to lead longer, more independent lives.

=== Care Center Network ===
MDA's Care Center Network is recognized as the largest network of multidisciplinary clinics specializing in neuromuscular diseases in the United States, with over 150 clinics distributed throughout the country. In addition to offering specialized care, these centers are also active sites of research.

In 2023, MDA expanded its Resource Center by launching the Gene Therapy Support Network. This network provides resources and guidance about approved gene therapies for people living with neuromuscular diseases, aiming to help the community navigate the complexities of emerging gene therapies. Clinical networking through the MDA Care Center Network contributes additional support by facilitating best practice sharing between different care centers.

== Diseases targeted ==
MDA targets a wide range of neuromuscular diseases, including muscular dystrophies, motor neuron diseases, ion channel diseases, mitochondrial diseases, myopathies, neuromuscular junction diseases, and peripheral nerve diseases. Specific examples include Duchenne muscular dystrophy (DMD), a severe form of muscular dystrophy, ALS (amyotrophic lateral sclerosis), and Charcot–Marie–Tooth disease (CMT), which impacts peripheral nerves.

MDA also addresses numerous rare disorders, such as Andersen–Tawil syndrome, Laing distal myopathy, and Walker–Warburg syndrome. Additionally, the association covers conditions like Becker muscular dystrophy (BMD), congenital muscular dystrophies (CMD), myotonic dystrophy (DM), spinal muscular atrophy (SMA), and myasthenia gravis (MG).

== Legislation ==
MDA supported the Newborn Screening Saves Lives Reauthorization Act of 2013 (H.R. 1281; 113th Congress), a bill that would amend the Public Health Service Act to reauthorize grant programs and other initiatives to promote expanded screening of newborns and children for heritable disorders. The MDA argued that "many of the drug therapies currently under development for MDA's community will be of most benefit if administered either pre-symptomatically or early in the progression of the disease. Thus, for some of the diseases in MDA's program, the availability of a newborn screening program at the time of treatment availability presents the best opportunity for impacting optimal and potentially lifesaving treatment outcomes."

MDA supported the Paul D. Wellstone Muscular Dystrophy Community Assistance, Research and Education Amendments of 2013 (H.R. 594; 113th Congress), a bill that would amend the Public Health Service Act to revise the muscular dystrophy research program of the National Institutes of Health (NIH). MDA argued that "a great deal of work still needs to be done, and increased federal support is needed to ensure that researchers can continue making progress toward finding a cure."

In December 2021, President Joe Biden signed the Accelerating Access to Critical Therapies for ALS Act into law. The act aimed to speed up the development and approval of therapies for ALS and other neuromuscular diseases. During the signing ceremony, President Biden acknowledged the Muscular Dystrophy Association for playing a crucial role in advocating for the legislation.

In May 2024, MDA supported the reauthorization of the Federal Aviation Administration (FAA) through a $105 billion bill passed by Congress. The legislation includes improvements in air travel accessibility for people with disabilities, representing significant progress in this area.

== Independent charity assessments ==
MDA is recognized by the Better Business Bureau's Wise Giving Alliance as an accredited charity that meets all 20 Standards for Charity Accountability. As of the year ending December 31, 2022, MDA reported significant funding directed towards patient and community services, professional public health education, and research. The organization's financial activities, leadership compensation, and fundraising methods are transparently disclosed, emphasizing their commitment to accountability and ethical practices.

Charity Navigator, which is the largest independent evaluator of charities, gives MDA three out of four stars based on Financial, Accountability, and Transparency Performance Metrics. In 2019, CharityWatch gave MDA a grade of D, citing many financial issues in the organization.

MDA has received the Candid Platinum Seal of Transparency from GuideStar, recognizing its commitment to transparency and accountability.

== Criticism ==
Disability rights activists, including Mike Ervin and his group Jerry's Orphans, have criticized the MDA and Lewis for promoting a "charity mentality" that portrays people with MD as pitiable victims in need of charity or a cure.

== External links and sources ==
- Muscular Dystrophy Association's website
- MDA Puerto Rico website (in Spanish)
- Wise Giving Alliance report on MDA from the Better Business Bureau
- The Kids Are All Right, a documentary film critical of the MDA and Jerry Lewis
