= Paul D. Wellstone Muscular Dystrophy Community Assistance, Research and Education Amendments of 2013 =

US law

- Long title: To reauthorize and extend the Paul D. Wellstone Muscular Dystrophy Community Assistance, Research, and Education Amendments of 2008.
- Announced in: the 113th United States Congress
- Sponsored by: Rep. Michael C. Burgess (R, TX-26)
- Number of co-sponsors: 1

Citations
- Public law: Pub. L. 113–166 (text) (PDF)

Codification
- Acts affected: Public Health Service Act, Muscular Dystrophy Community Assistance, Research and Education Amendments of 2001
- U.S.C. sections affected: 42 U.S.C. § 247b–18, 42 U.S.C. § 283g, 42 U.S.C. § 247b–19
- Agencies affected: Social Security Administration, National Institutes of Health, United States Department of Education, Department of Health and Human Services, United States Department of Defense, Food and Drug Administration

Legislative history
- Introduced in the House as H.R. 594 by Rep. Michael C. Burgess (R, TX-26) on February 8, 2013; Committee consideration by United States House Committee on Energy and Commerce, United States House Energy Subcommittee on Health; Passed the House on July 28, 2014 (voice vote); Passed the Senate on September 18, 2014 (Unanimous consent); Signed into law by President Barack Obama on September 26, 2014

The Paul D. Wellstone Muscular Dystrophy Community Assistance, Research and Education Amendments of 2013 (H.R. 594; Pub. L. 113–166 (text) (PDF)) is a United States public law that amends the Public Health Service Act to revise the muscular dystrophy research program of the National Institutes of Health (NIH).

The bill was introduced into the United States House of Representatives during the 113th United States Congress.

== Background ==
The Muscular Dystrophy Community Assistance Research and Education Amendments of 2001 ("MD CARE Act", Pub. L. 107–84 (text) (PDF), H.R. 717, 115 Stat. 823, enacted December 18, 2001) amended the Public Health Service Act to provide for research with respect to various forms of muscular dystrophy, including Duchenne, Becker, limb girdle, congenital, facioscapulohumeral, myotonic, oculopharyngeal, distal, and Emery–Dreifuss muscular dystrophies.

According to the Muscular Dystrophy Association, "since 2001, there have been 67 clinical trials of drugs or therapies for muscular dystrophy, and currently 37 clinical trials are under way."

== Provisions of the bill ==
This summary is based largely on the summary provided by the Congressional Research Service, a public domain source.

The Paul D. Wellstone Muscular Dystrophy Community Assistance, Research and Education Amendments of 2013 would amend the Public Health Service Act to revise the muscular dystrophy research program of the National Institutes of Health (NIH).

The bill would expand the range of forms of muscular dystrophy included within the program. Requires the research conducted through Paul D. Wellstone Muscular Dystrophy Cooperative Research Centers to include cardiac and pulmonary function research. Requires the Director of NIH to ensure the sharing of data between such centers.

The bill would revise the composition of the Muscular Dystrophy Coordinating Committee (MDCC) to include the Social Security Administration and the United States Administration for Community Living.

The bill would require the MDCC to meet at least two times per year. Requires the MDCC Action Plan to provide for: (1) health economic studies to demonstrate the cost-effectiveness of providing independent living resources and support to patients with various forms of muscular dystrophy, (2) studies to determine optimal clinical care interventions for adults with various forms of muscular dystrophy, and (3) the development of clinical interventions to improve the health of adults with various forms of muscular dystrophy.

The bill would require the MDCC to develop a plan to expedite the evaluation and approval of emerging therapies and personalized medicines that have the potential to decrease fatal disease progression across the various forms of muscular dystrophy.

The bill would require the United States Secretary of Health and Human Services (HHS), in carrying out epidemiological activities regarding Duchenne and other forms of muscular dystrophies, to ensure that data from different racial and ethnic populations is captured and made publicly available to investigators conducting public or private research on muscular dystrophy. Directs the Secretary to foster ongoing engagement and collaboration between the surveillance program and the research centers.

The bill would amend the Muscular Dystrophy Community Assistance, Research, and Education Amendments of 2001 to authorize the Secretary to: (1) update and disseminate widely existing Duchenne-Becker muscular dystrophy care considerations for pediatric patients, and (2) develop and disseminate widely Duchenne-Becker muscular dystrophy considerations for adult patients and acute care considerations for all muscular dystrophy populations. Directs that such care considerations should build upon existing efforts currently underway for specified forms of muscular dystrophy and incorporate strategies specifically responding to the findings of the national transitions survey of minority, young adult, and adult communities of muscular dystrophy patients.

== Congressional Budget Office report ==
This summary is based largely on the summary provided by the Congressional Budget Office, as ordered reported by the House Committee on Energy and Commerce on July 15, 2014. This is a public domain source.

H.R. 594 would amend the Public Health Service Act to reauthorize surveillance, research, and education activities relating to muscular dystrophy. The bill would expand the portfolios of the National Institutes of Health (NIH) and the Centers for Disease Control and Prevention (CDC) to include additional forms of muscular dystrophy. It also would direct CDC to capture more representative data regarding muscular dystrophy across populations.

The Congressional Budget Office (CBO) estimates that implementing H.R. 594 would cost $323 million over the 2015-2019 period, assuming appropriation of the necessary amounts. Pay-as-you-go procedures do not apply to this legislation because it would not affect direct spending or revenues.

H.R. 594 contains no intergovernmental and private-sector mandates as defined in the Unfunded Mandates Reform Act.

== Procedural history ==
The Paul D. Wellstone Muscular Dystrophy Community Assistance, Research and Education Amendments of 2013 was introduced into the United States House of Representatives on February 8, 2013, by Rep. Michael C. Burgess (R, TX-26). The bill was referred to the United States House Committee on Energy and Commerce and the United States House Energy Subcommittee on Health. On July 24, 2014, the bill was reported (amended) alongside House Report 113-556. On July 28, 2014, the House passed the bill in a voice vote. The United States Senate voted on September 26, 2014, to pass the bill with unanimous consent. On September 26, 2014, President Barack Obama signed the bill into law and it became Pub. L. 113–166 (text) (PDF).

== Debate and discussion ==
The Parent Project Muscular Dystrophy supported the bill, urging supporters to take action to help them pass the bill. According to the organization, the bill would "update the landmark MD-CARE Act law that has done so much over the past 13 years to extend and improve life for those impacted by Duchenne and other forms of Muscular Dystrophy and to spur breakthroughs in research that we believe are getting us closer to effective therapies and treatments."

The Muscular Dystrophy Association supported the bill, listing the accomplishments since the first law was enacted, but arguing that "a great deal of work still needs to be done, and increased federal support is needed to ensure that researchers can continue making progress toward finding a cure."

== See also ==
- List of bills in the 113th United States Congress
