= Lunsotogene parvec =

Gene therapy treatment

Clinical data
- Trade names: Otarmeni
- Other names: DB-OTO, lunsotogene parvec-cwha
- AHFS/Drugs.com: Monograph
- MedlinePlus: a626065
- License data: US DailyMed: Lunsotogene parvec
- Routes of administration: Intracochlear infusion
- ATC code: None

Legal status
- Legal status: US: ℞-only

Identifiers
- CAS Number: 2907748-12-1
- DrugBank: DB18278
- UNII: P6ZNU67HPU
- KEGG: D13347

Lunsotogene parvec, sold under the brand name Otarmeni, is a gene therapy treatment designed to reverse nonsyndromic deafness caused by a rare mutation in the OTOF gene. It is an adeno-associated virus vector-based gene therapy. The drug was developed under the investigational name DB-OTO by Decibel Therapeutics, which was bought out by Regeneron in 2023. The drug was approved by the US Food and Drug Administration in 2026. It is the first approved gene therapy to target hearing loss. The drug uses an adeno-associated virus to deliver DNA encoding otoferlin that is regulated by a hair cell–specific promoter.

== Medical uses ==
Lunsotogene parvec is indicated for the treatment of people with severe-to-profound and profound sensorineural hearing loss (any frequency >90 dB HL) associated with molecularly confirmed biallelic variants in the OTOF gene, preserved outer hair cell function, and no prior cochlear implant in the same ear.

== Society and culture ==
=== Legal status ===
Lunsotogene parvec was approved for medical use in the United States in April 2026.

=== Names ===
Lunsotogene parvec is the international nonproprietary name.

Lunsotogene parvec is sold under the brand name Otarmeni.
