= Muscular Dystrophy Community Assistance Research and Education Amendments of 2001 =

The Muscular Dystrophy Community Assistance Research and Education Amendments of 2001 ("MD CARE Act", Pub. L. 107–84 (text) (PDF), H.R. 717, 115 Stat. 823, enacted December 18, 2001) amended the Public Health Service Act to provide for research with respect to various forms of muscular dystrophy, including Duchenne, Becker, limb girdle, congenital, facioscapulohumeral, myotonic, oculopharyngeal, distal, and Emery–Dreifuss muscular dystrophies.

== MDCC ==
The act established a Federal Advisory Committee called the Muscular Dystrophy Coordinating Committee (MDCC), which is composed of no more than 15 members to coordinate the activities across the National Institutes and with other Federal health programs and activities relating to the various forms of muscular dystrophy. By law the committee's composition is 2/3s governmental agencies and 1/3 public membership, including a broad cross section of persons affected with muscular dystrophies including parents or legal guardians, affected individuals, researchers, and clinicians. Public members appointed serve for a term of 3 years, and may serve for an unlimited number of terms if reappointed.

The MD-CARE Act directed the Committee to develop a plan for conducting and supporting research and education on muscular dystrophy through the national research institutes, and to submit this plan to Congress within the first year of the establishment of the MDCC. The MDCC has conducted two stages of planning. The first stage led to the Muscular Dystrophy Research and Education Plan for NIH, which was submitted to Congress in August 2004. This formed the basis for a subsequent, more intensive planning process that produced the January 2006 MDCC Action Plan for the Muscular Dystrophies. The Action Plan contains specific research objectives that are appropriate to the missions of all MDCC member agencies and organizations and thus serves as a central focus for coordination of research in muscular dystrophy.

== Amendments ==
On July 28, 2014, the United States House of Representatives voted to pass the Paul D. Wellstone Muscular Dystrophy Community Assistance, Research and Education Amendments of 2013 (H.R. 594; 113th Congress), a bill that would amend the Public Health Service Act to revise the muscular dystrophy research program of the National Institutes of Health (NIH). The bill would amend the Muscular Dystrophy Community Assistance Research and Education Amendments of 2001 to authorize the Secretary of Health and Human Services to: (1) update and disseminate widely existing Duchenne-Becker muscular dystrophy care considerations for pediatric patients, and (2) develop and disseminate widely Duchenne-Becker muscular dystrophy considerations for adult patients and acute care considerations for all muscular dystrophy populations.
