= Adenylosuccinate synthase =

Enzyme

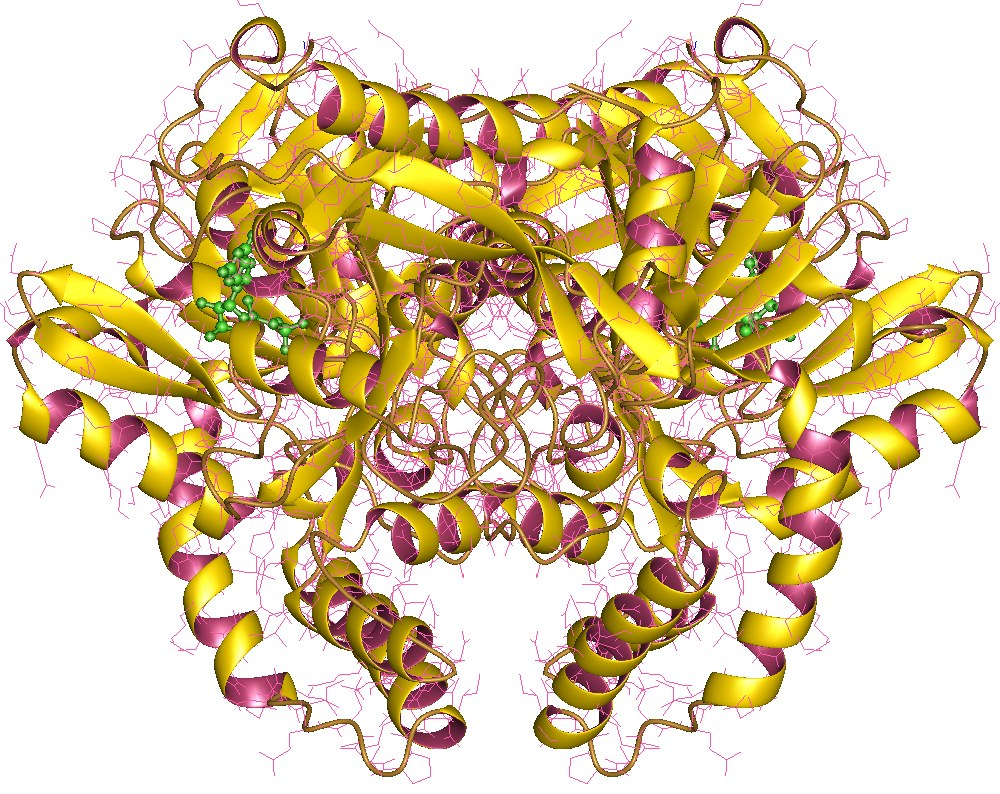
- Adenylosuccinate synthetase dimer, Human

Identifiers
- EC no.: 6.3.4.4
- CAS no.: 9023-57-8

Databases
- BRENDA: enzyme data
- ExPASy: NiceZyme view
- KEGG: enzyme entry
- MetaCyc: metabolic pathway
- Rhea: reactions
- PDB structures: RCSB PDB PDBe PDBsum
- Gene Ontology: AmiGO / QuickGO
Search
- PMC: articles
- PubMed: articles
- NCBI: proteins

Adenylsucc_synt
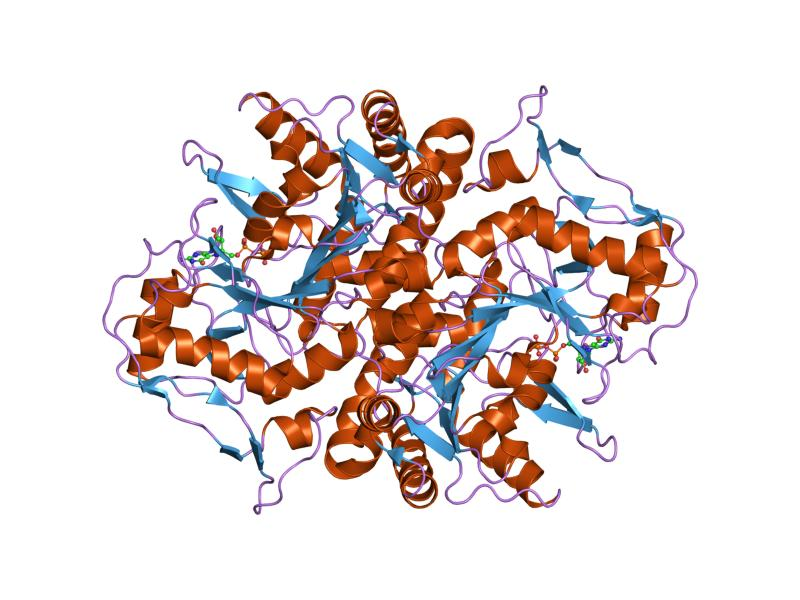
- structures of adenylosuccinate synthetase from Triticum aestivum and Arabidopsis thaliana

Identifiers
- Symbol: Adenylsucc_synt
- Pfam: PF00709
- Pfam clan: CL0023
- InterPro: IPR001114
- PROSITE: PDOC00444
- SCOP2: 1ade / SCOPe / SUPFAM
Available protein structures:
- PDB: IPR001114 PF00709 (ECOD; PDBsum)
- AlphaFold: IPR001114; PF00709

In molecular biology, adenylosuccinate synthase (or adenylosuccinate synthetase) (EC 6.3.4.4) is an enzyme that plays an important role in purine biosynthesis, by catalysing the guanosine triphosphate (GTP)-dependent conversion of inosine monophosphate (IMP) and aspartic acid to guanosine diphosphate (GDP), phosphate and N(6)-(1,2-dicarboxyethyl)-AMP. Adenylosuccinate synthetase has been characterised from various sources ranging from Escherichia coli (gene purA) to vertebrate tissues. In vertebrates, two isozymes are present: one involved in purine biosynthesis and the other in the purine nucleotide cycle.

== Structure ==
The crystal structure of adenylosuccinate synthetase from E. coli reveals that the dominant structural element of each monomer of the homodimer is a central beta-sheet of 10 strands. The first nine strands of the sheet are mutually parallel with right-handed crossover connections between the strands. The 10th strand is antiparallel with respect to the first nine strands. In addition, the enzyme has two antiparallel beta-sheets, composed of two strands and three strands each, 11 alpha-helices and two short 3_{10}-helices. Further, it has been suggested that the similarities in the GTP-binding domains of the synthetase and the p21ras protein are an example of convergent evolution of two distinct families of GTP-binding proteins. Structures of adenylosuccinate synthetase from Triticum aestivum and Arabidopsis thaliana when compared with the known structures from E. coli reveals that the overall fold is very similar to that of the E. coli protein.

== Isozymes ==
Humans express two adenylosuccinate synthase isozymes:

Adenylosuccinate synthetase isozyme 2

Identifiers
- Symbol: ADSS2
- NCBI gene: 159
- HGNC: 292
- OMIM: 103060
- RefSeq: NM_001126
- UniProt: P30520

Other data
- EC number: 6.3.4.4
- Locus: Chr. 1 q44
Search for
- Structures: Swiss-model
- Domains: InterPro

Adenylosuccinate synthase isozyme 1

Identifiers
- Symbol: ADSS1
- NCBI gene: 122622
- HGNC: 20093
- OMIM: 612498
- RefSeq: NM_152328
- UniProt: Q8N142

Other data
- EC number: 6.3.4.4
- Locus: Chr. 14 q32.33
Search for
- Structures: Swiss-model
- Domains: InterPro
