= Dysferlin =

Protein encoded by the DYSF gene in humans

DYSF
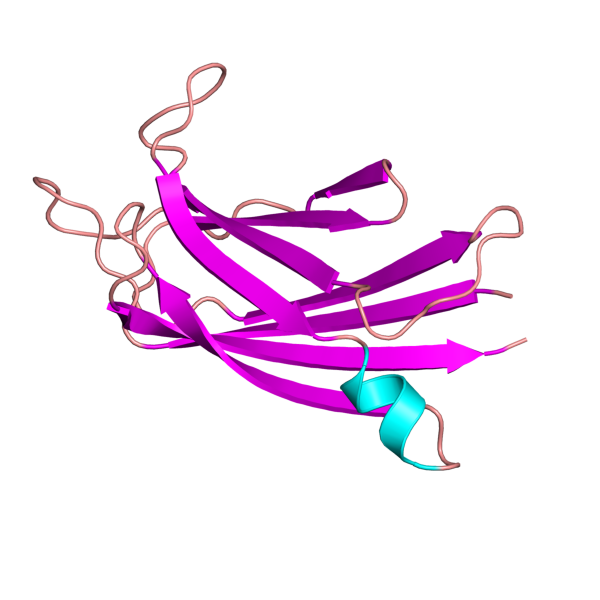

Identifiers
- Aliases: DYSF, FER1L1, LGMD2B, MMD1, dysferlin, LGMDR2
- External IDs: OMIM: 603009; MGI: 1349385; GeneCards: DYSF
Available structures
PDB	Ortholog search: PDBe RCSB
PDB	List of PDB id codes 4CAH, 4CAI, 4IHB, 4IQH

Gene location (Human)
Chr.	Chromosome 2 (human)
Band	2p13.2	Start	71,453,561 bp
Band	2p13.2	End	71,686,763 bp

Gene location (Mouse)
Chr.	Chromosome 6 (mouse)
Band	6 C3|6 36.14 cM	Start	83,985,572 bp
Band	6 C3|6 36.14 cM	End	84,188,042 bp
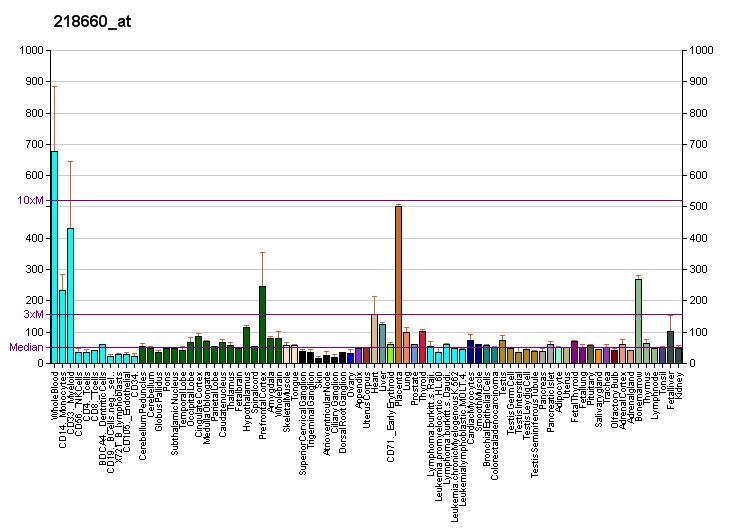
RNA expression pattern
Bgee	Human / Mouse (ortholog); Top expressed in: blood; muscle of thigh; Skeletal muscle tissue of rectus abdominis; triceps brachii muscle; apex of heart; vastus lateralis muscle; external globus pallidus; gastrocnemius muscle; Skeletal muscle tissue of biceps brachii; glutes / Top expressed in: muscle of thigh; lumbar spinal ganglion; soleus muscle; skeletal muscle tissue; interventricular septum; yolk sac; triceps brachii muscle; temporal muscle; quadriceps femoris muscle; digastric muscle; More reference expression data
BioGPS	More reference expression data
Gene ontology
Molecular function	calcium ion binding; metal ion binding; protein binding; calcium-dependent phospholipid binding; phospholipid binding; lipid binding; microtubule binding; alpha-tubulin binding
Cellular component	integral component of membrane; endosome; late endosome; membrane; T-tubule; plasma membrane; endocytic vesicle; early endosome; sarcolemma; extracellular exosome; cytoplasmic vesicle membrane; cytoplasmic vesicle; lamellipodium; microtubule organizing center; nucleus; Golgi apparatus; microtubule; membrane microdomain
Biological process	muscle contraction; plasma membrane repair; vesicle fusion; angiogenesis; positive regulation of endothelial cell proliferation; monocyte activation involved in immune response; macrophage activation involved in immune response; glycerol metabolic process; negative regulation of gene expression; lipid storage; T-tubule organization; negative regulation of protein catabolic process; skeletal muscle tissue regeneration; fat cell differentiation; positive regulation of cell adhesion; negative regulation of phagocytosis; cellular response to osmotic stress; positive regulation of neutrophil chemotaxis; regulation of calcium ion import; negative regulation of high voltage-gated calcium channel activity; negative regulation of protein polyubiquitination
Sources:Amigo / QuickGO
Orthologs
Databases	NCBI: entry; OMA: entry
Species	Human	Mouse
Entrez	8291	26903
Ensembl	ENSG00000135636	ENSMUSG00000033788
UniProt	O75923	Q9ESD7
RefSeq (mRNA)	NM_001130455; NM_001130976; NM_001130977; NM_001130978; NM_001130979 NM_001130980; NM_001130981; NM_001130982; NM_001130983; NM_001130984; NM_001130985; NM_001130986; NM_001130987; NM_003494	NM_001077694; NM_021469; NM_001310152
RefSeq (protein)	NP_001123927; NP_001124448; NP_001124449; NP_001124450; NP_001124451 NP_001124452; NP_001124453; NP_001124454; NP_001124455; NP_001124456; NP_001124457; NP_001124458; NP_001124459; NP_003485	NP_001071162; NP_001297081; NP_067444; NP_001390584; NP_001390585 NP_001390586; NP_001390587
Location (UCSC)	Chr 2: 71.45 – 71.69 Mb	Chr 6: 83.99 – 84.19 Mb
PubMed search
- Wikidata
View/Edit Human	View/Edit Mouse

Dysferlin also known as dystrophy-associated fer-1-like protein is a protein that in humans is encoded by the DYSF gene. Dysferlin is linked with plasma membrane repair., stabilization of calcium signaling and the development of the T-tubule system of the muscle A defect in the DYSF gene, located on chromosome 2p12-14, results in several types of muscular dystrophy; including Miyoshi myopathy (MM), Limb-girdle muscular dystrophy type 2B (LGMD2B) and Distal Myopathy (DM), now collectively referred to as LGMD R2. A reduction or absence of dysferlin, termed dysferlinopathy, usually becomes apparent in the third or fourth decade of life and is characterised by weakness and wasting of various voluntary skeletal muscles. Pathogenic mutations leading to dysferlinopathy can occur throughout the DYSF gene.

== Structure ==
Ferlin family

Identifiers
- Symbol: Dysferlin
- OPM superfamily: 452
- OPM protein: 4cah
- Membranome: 205

The human dysferlin protein is a 237 kilodalton type-II transmembrane protein. It contains a large intracellular cytoplasmic N-terminal domain, an extreme C-terminal transmembrane domain, and a short C-terminal extracellular domain. The cytosolic domain of dysferlin is composed of seven highly conserved C2 domains (C2A-G) which are conserved across several proteins within the ferlin family, including dysferlin homolog myoferlin. In fact, the C2 domain at any given position is more similar to the C2 domain at the corresponding position within other ferlin family members than the adjacent C2 domain within the same protein. This suggests that each individual C2 domain may in fact play a specific role in dysferlin function and each has in fact been shown to be required for two of dysferlin's roles stabilization of calcium signaling and membrane repair. Mutations in each of these domains can cause dysferlinopathy. A crystal structure of the C2A domain of human dysferlin has been solved, and reveals that the C2A domain changes conformation when interacting with calcium ions, which is consistent with a growing body of evidence suggesting that the C2A domain plays a role in calcium-dependent lipid binding. Its ability to stabilize calcium signaling in the intact dysferlin protein depends on its calcium binding activity. In addition to the C2 domains, dysferlin also contains "FerA" and "DysF" domains. Mutations in both FerA and DysF can cause muscular dystrophies. DysF domain has an interesting structure as in contains one DysF domain within another DysF domain, a result of gene duplication; however, the function of this domain is currently unknown. FerA domain is conserved among all members of ferlin protein family. FerA domain is a four helix bundle and it can interact with membrane, usually in a calcium-dependent manner.

== Function ==
The most intensively studied role for dysferlin is in a cellular process called membrane repair. Membrane repair is a critical mechanism by which cells are able to seal dramatic wounds to the plasma membrane. Muscle is thought to be particularly prone to membrane wounds given that muscle cells transmit high force and undergo cycles of contraction. Dysferlin is highly expressed in muscle, and is homologous to the ferlin family of proteins, which are thought to regulate membrane fusion across a wide variety of species and cell types. Several lines of evidence suggest that dysferlin may be involved in membrane repair in muscle. First, dysferlin-deficient muscle fibers show accumulation of vesicles (which are critical for membrane repair in non-muscle cell types) near membrane lesions, indicating that dysferlin may be required for fusion of repair vesicles with the plasma membrane. Further, dysferlin-deficient muscle fibers take up extracellular dyes to a greater extent than wild-type muscle fibers following laser-induced wounding in-vitro. Dysferlin is also markedly enriched at membrane lesions with several additional proteins thought to be involved in membrane resealing, including annexin and MG53. Exactly how dysferlin contributes to membrane resealing is not clear, but biochemical evidence indicates that dysferlin may bind lipids in a calcium-dependent manner, consistent with a role for dysferlin in regulating fusion of repair vesicles with the sarcolemma during membrane repair. Furthermore, live-cell imaging of dysferlin-eGFP expressing myotubes indicates that dysferlin localizes to a cellular compartment that responds to injury by forming large dysferlin-containing vesicles, and formation of these vesicles may contribute to wound repair. Dysferlin may also be involved in Alzheimer's disease pathogenesis.

Another well studied role for dysferlin is in stabilization of calcium signaling, especially following a mild injury. This approach was based on two observations: that muscle lacking dysferlin that is injured by eccentric contractions can repair its plasma membrane, or sarcolemma, as efficiently as healthy muscle can, and that most of the dysferlin in healthy muscle is concentrated in the transverse tubules at triad junctions, where calcium release is regulated. The absence of dysferlin in skeletal muscle leads to the increased leak of calcium ions through the ryanodine receptor, which in turn depletes the terminal cisternae of the sarcoplasmic reticulum of calcium ions and destabilizes calcium signaling, which can contribute to the disease pathology.

Nearly every change in dysferlin that affects membrane repair also destabilizes calcium signaling, suggesting that these two activities may be linked. Membrane repair can occur in the absence of stabilization of calcium signaling, however, and may not be sufficient to restore the health of muscle fibers. Remarkably, however, membrane repair requires calcium ions, whereas calcium ions contribute to the destabilization of signaling when dysferlin is absent or mutated. These paradoxical results have yet to be reconciled.

== Interactions ==
Dysferlin has been shown to bind to itself, to form dimers and perhaps larger oligomers. It can also has been shown to interact with Caveolin 3 in skeletal muscle, and this interaction is thought to retain dysferlin within the plasma membrane. Dysferlin also interacts with MG53, and a functional interaction between dysferlin, caveolin-3 and MG53 is thought to be critical for membrane repair in skeletal muscle. Its localization to the triad junctions of skeletal muscle and its role in stabilizing calcium signaling suggest that it may also interact with the junctional proteins that regulate calcium release. These interactions remain to be identified, however.
