= CIMIP2B =

Protein-coding gene in the species Homo sapiens

Identifiers
- Aliases: CIMIP2B, family with sequence similarity 166 member B, FAM166B, Ciliary microtubule inner protein 2B
- External IDs: MGI: 2445194; GeneCards: CIMIP2B

Gene location (Human)
Chr.	Chromosome 9 (human)
Band	9p13.3	Start	35,561,831 bp
Band	9p13.3	End	35,563,899 bp

Gene location (Mouse)
Chr.	Chromosome 4 (mouse)
Band	4|4 A5	Start	43,427,019 bp
Band	4|4 A5	End	43,429,134 bp
RNA expression pattern
Bgee	Human / Mouse (ortholog); Top expressed in: right adrenal cortex; right uterine tube; left adrenal cortex; muscle of thigh; gastrocnemius muscle; olfactory zone of nasal mucosa; testicle; skeletal muscle tissue; gonad; quadriceps femoris muscle / Top expressed in: hypothalamus; embryo; ovary; embryo; lung; proximal tubule; esophagus; hippocampus proper; zone of skin; epiblast; More reference expression data
BioGPS	n/a
Orthologs
Databases	NCBI: entry; OMA: entry
Species	Human	Mouse
Entrez	730112	329831
Ensembl	ENSG00000215187	ENSMUSG00000042788
UniProt	A8MTA8; B7ZW33	A2AIP0
RefSeq (mRNA)	NM_001099951; NM_001164310; NM_001287238; NM_001287239	NM_001162381; NM_177377; NM_001369077
RefSeq (protein)	NP_001093421; NP_001157782; NP_001274167; NP_001274168; NP_001274168.1	NP_001155853; NP_796351; NP_001356006
Location (UCSC)	Chr 9: 35.56 – 35.56 Mb	Chr 4: 43.43 – 43.43 Mb
PubMed search
- Wikidata
View/Edit Human	View/Edit Mouse

Ciliary microtubule inner protein 2B protein that in humans is encoded by the CIMIP2B gene (previously FAM166B). The CIMIP2B protein is a cilia protein which is involved in their movement.

== Gene ==
The FAM166B gene is located on the short arm of chromosome 9 at 9p13.3 on the minus strand. The genomic sequence spans 2,069 base pairs from 35563899 to 35561830. Gene neighbors are RUSC2, RPS29P17, and TESK1.

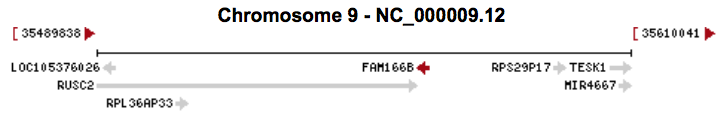
Location and Neighborhood of FAM166B on Chromosome 9

=== Expression ===
FAM166B is expressed 0.5 times higher than average in humans. FAM166B is highly expressed in the adrenal gland, fallopian tube, and respiratory epithelial tissues. It is weakly to moderately expressed in skeletal muscle and heart muscle.

=== Promoter ===
FAM166B is predicted to have a promoter that spans 680 bp and includes the 5' UTR.

== mRNA ==
In humans, FAM166B has 10 transcript variants, which are all spliced. FAM166B transcript variant 1 is 1,092 bp in length and contains 6 total exons. The accession number for this variant is NM_001164310.

== Protein ==
The amino acid sequence is 275 amino acids in length and contains 3 DUF 2475 regions. The three DUF2475 regions are located from amino acids 15 to 80, 174 to 234, and 234 to 261.The predicted molecular weight is 30.6 kdal with the predicted isoelectric point of 8.414. It is known to have a higher than normal proline composition compared to other human proteins at 12.4%. The protein has a negative charged region from residues 141 to 172.

1    MAVASTFIPGLNPQNPHYIPGYTGHCPLLRFSVGQTYGQVTGQLLRGPPGLAWPPVHRTLLPPIRPPRSP
71   EVPRESLPVRRGQERLSSSMIPGYTGFVPRAQFIFAKNCSQVWAEALSDFTHLHEKQGSEELPKEAKGRK
141  DTEKDQVPEPEGQLEEPTLEVVEQASPYSMDDRDPRKFFMSGFTGYVPCARFLFGSSFPVLTNQALQEFG
211  QKHSPGSAQDPKHLPPLPRTYPQNLGLLPNYGGYVPGYKFQFGHTFGHLTHDALGLSTFQKQLLA

=== Post-translational modifications ===
FAM166B is predicted to have 12 phosphorylation, 3 sumoylation, and 1 acetylation sites. FAM166 has no predicted signal peptide sequences.

=== Structure ===
FAM166B is predicted to be composed mostly of coils with short interspersed regions of alpha helices and beta sheets. There are no predicted transmembrane domains and this is consistent through orthologs.

=== Subcellular localization ===
However, the intracellular location of FAM166B is unknown. The average hydrophobicity of the protein is -0.519272, which suggests that it is a soluble protein.

== Homology ==
=== Orthologs ===
FAM166B has a number of orthologs in mammals, birds, reptiles, fish, and some invertebrates. The table below lists a number of FAM166B orthologs that were found using BLAST. The table descending exhibits the diversity of species with FAM166B orthologs in descending order of identity.

Scientific name	Common name	Protein Accession Number	Sequence length (aa)	Identity	Similarity
Homo Sapiens	Human	NP_001157782.1	275		
Camelus Ferus	Bactrian Camel	XP_006187942.1	279	83%	87%
Bos Taurus	Domestic Cow	XP_005210130.1	303	81%	87%
Felis catus	Domestic Cat	XP_003995654.1	280	81%	86%
Tursiops truncatus	Common Bottlenose Dolphin	XP_004312901.1	274	80%	86%
Elephantulus edwardii	Cape Elephant Shrew	XP_006887001.1	275	80%	86%
Mus Musculus	Mouse	XP_006538075.1	273	75%	82%
Dasypus novemcinctus	Nine-banded armadillo	XP_004457403.1	286	75%	82%
Equus caballus	Horse	XP_001914783.2	300	75%	80%
Monodelphis domestica	Gray short-tailed opossum	XP_007498869.1	292	57%	68%
Chelonia mydas	Green Turtle	XP_007055984.1	251	47%	62%
Tinamus guttatus	White-throated Tinamu	XP_010220019.1	307	45%	55%
Python bivittatus	Burmese Python	XP_007427141.1	340	42%	56%
Xenopus tropicalis	Western Clawed Frog	NP_001106452.1	306	42%	55%
Anolis carolinesis	Carolina Anole	XP_003228316.1	314	40%	53%
Danio rerio	Zebrafish	NP_001076489.2	299	39%	52%
Poecilia formosa	Amazon Molly	XP_007566989.1	262	34%	50%
Ciona intestinalis	Vase Tunicate	XP_002129379.1	330	30%	42%
Picoides pubescens	Downy Woodpecker	XP_009895146.1	296	26%	41%
Hydra vulgaris	Freshwater Polyp	XP_002162128.1	282	26%	41%
Saccoglossus kowalevskii	Acorn Worm	XP_002739701.1	332	24%	41%
Stronglyocentrotus purpuratus	Purple Sea Urchin	XP_786484.3	333	24%	40%

=== Paralogs ===
FAM166B has one paralog, FAM166A, which spans 317 aa and has a 25% identity. The accession number for FAM166A is NP_001001710.

== Clinical significance ==
=== Diseases ===
Currently, FAM166 is not associated within a human disease or condition. Despite being located on Spastic paraplegia 46, a locus on chromosome 9, that is known to cause an autosomal-recessive disease called hereditary spastic paraplegia (HSP), FAM166B was determined not to be the gene responsible for the disease due to its frequency in the population controls.
