= Myoferlin =

Protein-coding gene in the species Homo sapiens

MYOF
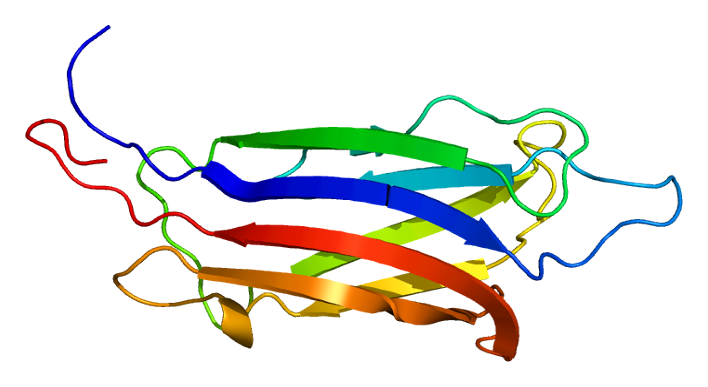

Identifiers
- Aliases: MYOF, FER1L3, myoferlin, HAE7
- External IDs: OMIM: 604603; MGI: 1919192; GeneCards: MYOF
Available structures
PDB	Ortholog search: PDBe RCSB
PDB	List of PDB id codes 2DMH, 2K2O

Gene location (Human)
Chr.	Chromosome 10 (human)
Band	10q23.33	Start	93,306,429 bp
Band	10q23.33	End	93,482,334 bp

Gene location (Mouse)
Chr.	Chromosome 19 (mouse)
Band	19|19 C2	Start	37,887,484 bp
Band	19|19 C2	End	38,032,025 bp
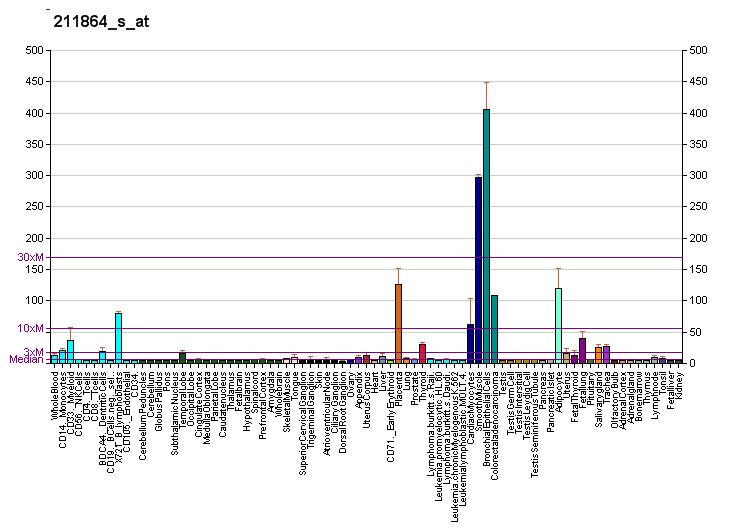

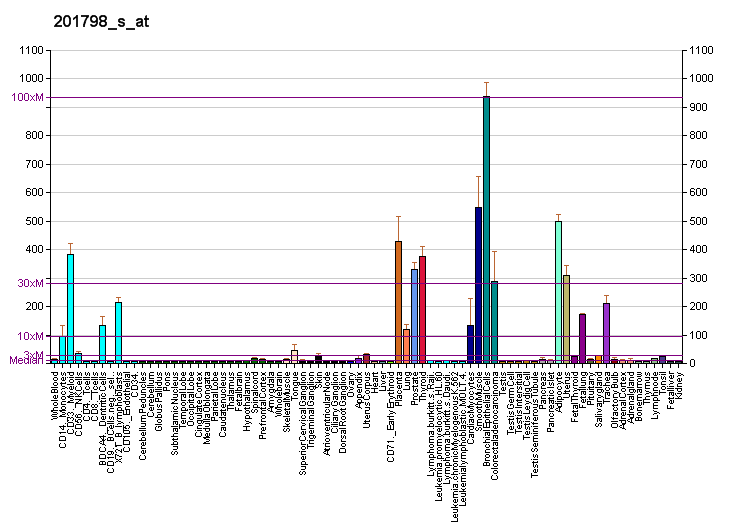
RNA expression pattern
Bgee	Human / Mouse (ortholog); Top expressed in: skin of hip; gingival epithelium; nasal epithelium; skin of thigh; stromal cell of endometrium; mucosa of paranasal sinus; epithelium of nasopharynx; urethra; palpebral conjunctiva; decidua / Top expressed in: transitional epithelium of urinary bladder; stroma of bone marrow; decidua; saccule; endothelial cell of lymphatic vessel; umbilical cord; uterus; right lung lobe; yolk sac; calvaria; More reference expression data
BioGPS	More reference expression data
Gene ontology
Molecular function	protein binding; phospholipid binding
Cellular component	caveola; integral component of membrane; plasma membrane; nuclear membrane; extracellular exosome; nuclear envelope; cytoplasmic vesicle membrane; cytoplasmic vesicle; intracellular membrane-bounded organelle; nucleus; membrane
Biological process	cellular response to heat; plasma membrane repair; muscle contraction; blood circulation; regulation of vascular endothelial growth factor receptor signaling pathway; myoblast fusion; glycerol metabolic process; T-tubule organization
Sources:Amigo / QuickGO
Orthologs
Databases	NCBI: entry; OMA: entry
Species	Human	Mouse
Entrez	26509	226101
Ensembl	ENSG00000138119	ENSMUSG00000048612
UniProt	Q9NZM1	Q69ZN7
RefSeq (mRNA)	NM_013451; NM_133337	NM_001099634; NM_001302140; NM_177035
RefSeq (protein)	NP_038479; NP_579899	NP_001093104; NP_001289069
Location (UCSC)	Chr 10: 93.31 – 93.48 Mb	Chr 19: 37.89 – 38.03 Mb
PubMed search
- Wikidata
View/Edit Human	View/Edit Mouse

Myoferlin is a protein that in humans is encoded by the MYOF gene.

Mutations in dysferlin, a protein associated with the plasma membrane, can cause muscle weakness that affects both proximal and distal muscles. The protein encoded by this gene is a type II membrane protein that is structurally similar to dysferlin. It is a member of the ferlin family and associates with both plasma and nuclear membranes.

Two transcript variants encoding different isoforms have been found for this gene. Other possible variants have been detected, but their full-length natures have not been determined.

== Structure and function ==
Myoferlin contains C2 domains that play a role in calcium-mediated membrane fusion events, suggesting that it may be involved in membrane regeneration and repair. Myoferlin also contains a FerA domain. FerA domains have been shown to interact with the membrane, suggesting that FerA domain in myoferlin may contribute to myoferlin's membrane interaction mechanism.

== Clinical significance ==
Myoferlin is overexpressed in several types of cancers, especially pancreas and triple-negative breast cancer. Overexpression of myoferlin is associated with proliferation, migration and invasion of cancer cells and silencing myoferlin's gene in triple-negative breast cancer can significantly reduce tumor growth and metastatic progression.
