= Distal myopathy =

- Other names: Distal muscular dystrophy
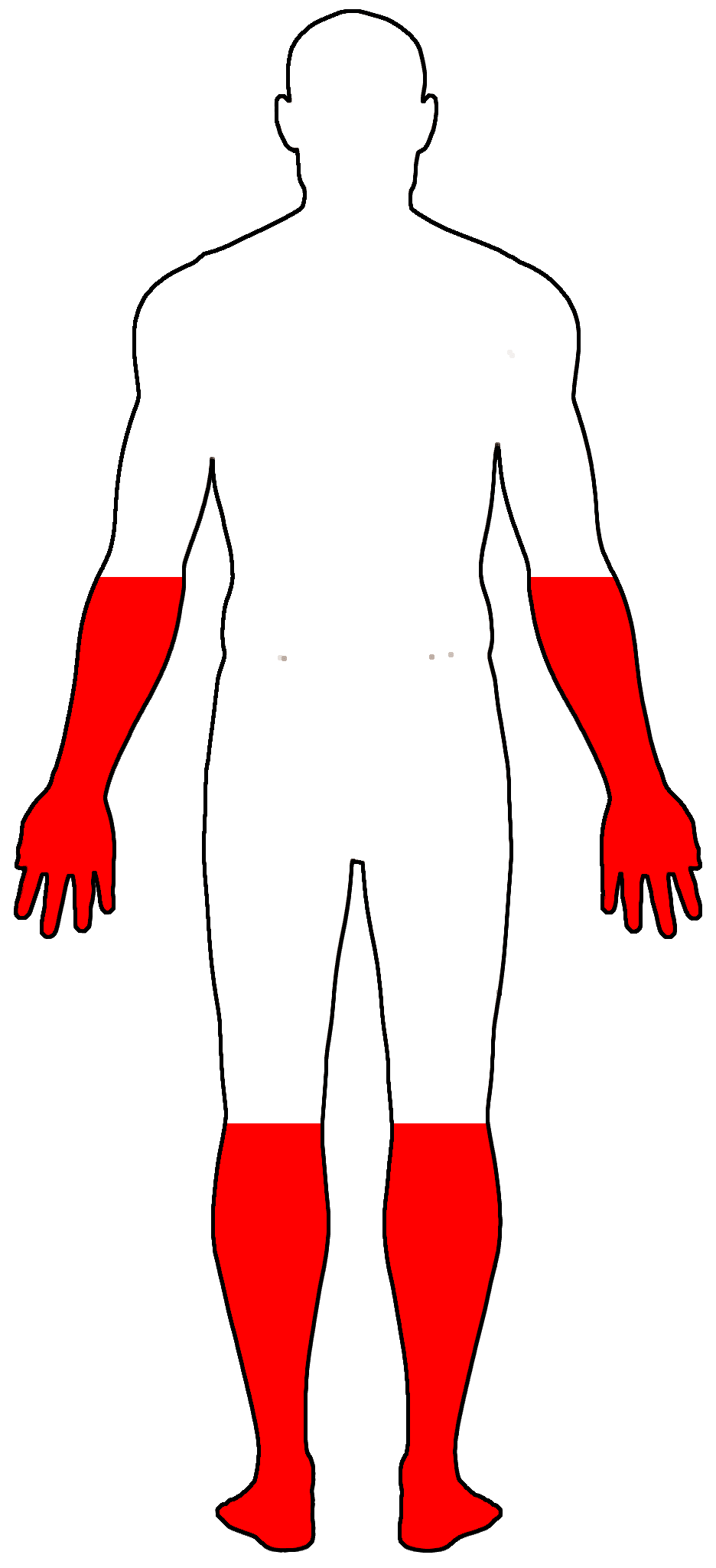
- Red depicts the preferentially affected areas in distal myopathy.
- Specialty: Neurology, neuromuscular medicine
- Symptoms: Weakness of hands and/or feet
- Complications: Cardiomyopathy
- Usual onset: Variable
- Duration: Lifetime
- Types: Classic, myofibrillar myopathy, other
- Causes: Genetic mutation of various genes
- Diagnostic method: Genetic testing, muscle biopsy
- Frequency: Rare

Distal myopathy is a group of rare genetic disorders that cause muscle damage and weakness, predominantly in the hands and/or feet. Mutation of many different genes can be causative. Many types involve dysferlin.

== Signs and symptoms ==
All of the different types affect different regions of the extremities and can show up as early as 5 years of age to as late as 50 years old. Distal myopathy has slow progress therefore the patient may not know that they have it until they are in their late 40s or 50s.

Miyoshi myopathy affects the posterior muscles of the lower leg, more so than the anterior muscles of the lower leg.

== Cause ==
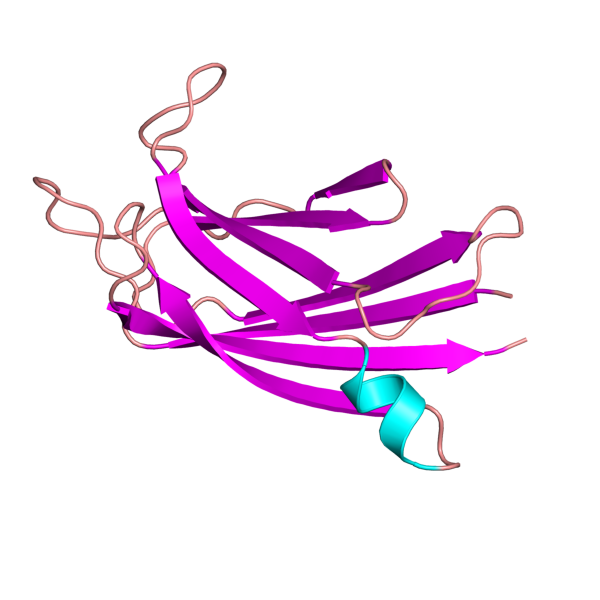
DYSF

The cause of this myopathy is very hard to determine because it can be a mutation in any of at least eight genes and not all are known yet. These mutations can be inherited from one parent, autosomal dominant, or from both parents, autosomal recessive. There are eight known types of distal myopathy.

=== Types ===
Classic distal muscular dystrophies
Type	Eponym	Inheritance	OMIM	Gene	Locus	Gene also implicated in:
Late adult-onset type 1	Welander	AD	604454	TIA1	2p13	
Late adult-onset type 2a - Finnish (tibial)	Udd	AD	600334	TTN	2q31.2	
Late adult-onset type 2b	Markesbery–Griggs	AD		ZASP	10q23.2	
Early adult-onset type 1	Nonaka	AR	605820	GNE	9p13.3	
Early adult-onset type 2	Miyoshi	AR	254130	DYSF	2p13.3-p13.1	limb-girdle muscular dystrophy type 2B.
Distal myopathy with anterior tibial onset (DMAT)		AR	606768	DYSF	2p13.3-p13.1	DMAT can be considered a variant of Miyoshi.
Early adult-onset type 3	Laing (Gower)	AD	160500	MYH7	14q11.2	
AD = autosomal dominant; AR = autosomal recessive

Myofibrillar myopathies classifiable as distal myopathy
Type	Eponym	Inheritance	OMIM	Gene	Locus	Gene also implicated in:
Desmin — adult onset (MFM1) Hereditary inclusion-body myositis type 1		AD				
αB-crystallin — early - mid adult (MFM2)		AD				
ZASP— late adult (MFM4)		AD				
Scapuloperoneal		AD				
MFM = myofibrillary myopathy; AD = autosomal dominant; AR = autosomal recessive

Other distal muscular dystrophies
Type	Eponym	Inheritance	OMIM	Gene	Locus	Gene also implicated in:
Distal myopathy with vocal cord and pharyngeal weakness		AD	606070	MATR3	5q31	Amyotrophic lateral sclerosis 21 (ALS21). One study suggests that all cases are ALS, justifying reclassification.

== Diagnosis ==
In terms of diagnosis, Vocal cord and pharyngeal distal myopathy should be assessed via serum CK levels, as well as muscle biopsy of the individual suspected of being afflicted with this condition

== Management ==
As of 2011, no disease modifying treatments are known. Foot drop can be managed with ankle-foot orthoses or surgical tendon transfer, in which the tibialis posterior muscle is repurposed to function as a tibialis anterior muscle. In select types of distal myopathy, evaluation of the heart may be indicated. Scoliosis and contractures can be surgically managed. In 2024 a drug to treat distal myopathy was approved in Japan.
