= CPNE6 =

Protein-coding gene in humans

Identifiers
- Aliases: CPNE6, copine 6
- External IDs: OMIM: 605688; MGI: 1334445; GeneCards: CPNE6

Gene location (Human)
Chr.	Chromosome 14 (human)
Band	14q11.2	Start	24,070,837 bp
Band	14q11.2	End	24,078,100 bp

Gene location (Mouse)
Chr.	Chromosome 14 (mouse)
Band	14|14 C3	Start	55,747,902 bp
Band	14|14 C3	End	55,754,888 bp
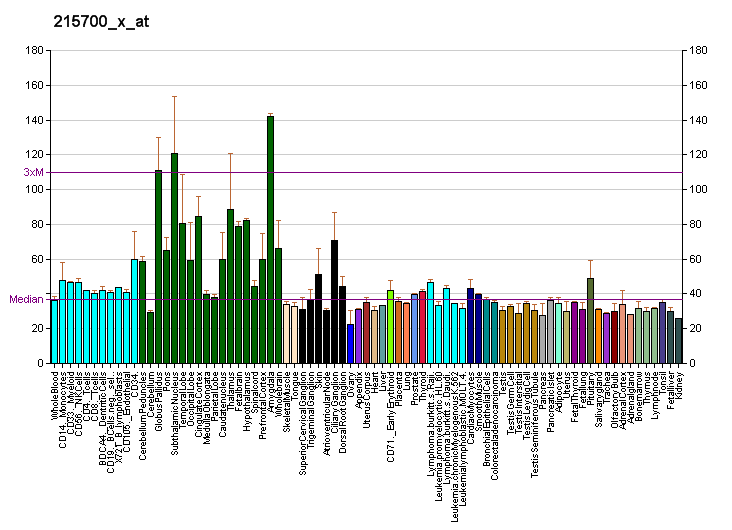

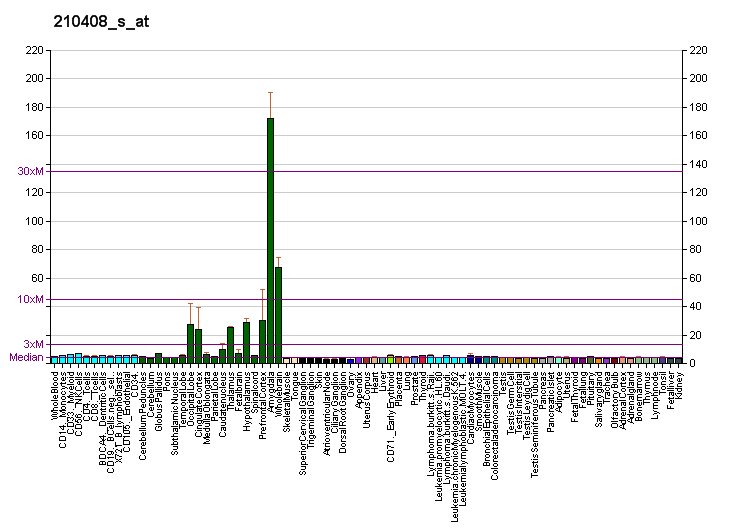
RNA expression pattern
Bgee	Human / Mouse (ortholog); Top expressed in: temporal lobe; amygdala; right hemisphere of cerebellum; hippocampus proper; superior frontal gyrus; right frontal lobe; nucleus accumbens; anterior cingulate cortex; prefrontal cortex; putamen / Top expressed in: CA3 field; subiculum; dentate gyrus; dentate gyrus of hippocampal formation granule cell; entorhinal cortex; perirhinal cortex; hippocampus proper; anterior amygdaloid area; Region I of hippocampus proper; facial motor nucleus; More reference expression data
BioGPS	More reference expression data
Gene ontology
Molecular function	calcium ion binding; transporter activity; phosphatidylserine binding; protein binding; calcium-dependent phospholipid binding
Cellular component	cytoplasm; endosome; perikaryon; cell projection; membrane; clathrin-coated endocytic vesicle; plasma membrane; axon; dendrite; extracellular exosome; cytoplasmic vesicle; clathrin-coated vesicle
Biological process	cellular response to calcium ion; cell differentiation; lipid metabolism; nervous system development; glycerophospholipid biosynthetic process; positive regulation of dendrite extension; vesicle-mediated transport; chemical synaptic transmission
Sources:Amigo / QuickGO
Orthologs
Databases	NCBI: entry; OMA: entry
Species	Human	Mouse
Entrez	9362	12891
Ensembl	ENSG00000100884	ENSMUSG00000022212
UniProt	O95741	Q9Z140
RefSeq (mRNA)	NM_001280558; NM_006032	NM_001136057; NM_001146183; NM_009947; NM_001360193
RefSeq (protein)	NP_001267487; NP_006023	NP_001129529; NP_001139655; NP_034077; NP_001347122
Location (UCSC)	Chr 14: 24.07 – 24.08 Mb	Chr 14: 55.75 – 55.75 Mb
PubMed search
- Wikidata
View/Edit Human	View/Edit Mouse

Copine-6 is a protein that in humans is encoded by the CPNE6 gene.

This gene encodes a brain-specific member of the copine family, which is composed of calcium-dependent membrane-binding proteins. The gene product contains two N-terminal C2 domains, and one von Willebrand factor A domain. It may have a role in synaptic plasticity.
