= Bacterial effector protein =

Bacterial effectors are proteins secreted by pathogenic bacteria into the cells of their host, usually using a type 3 secretion system (TTSS/T3SS), a type 4 secretion system (TFSS/T4SS) or a Type VI secretion system (T6SS). Some bacteria inject only a few effectors into their host's cells while others may inject dozens or even hundreds. Effector proteins may have many different activities, but usually help the pathogen to invade host tissue, suppress its immune system, or otherwise help the pathogen to survive. Effector proteins are usually critical for virulence. For instance, in the causative agent of plague (Yersinia pestis), the loss of the T3SS is sufficient to render the bacteria completely avirulent, even when they are directly introduced into the bloodstream. Gram negative microbes are also suspected to deploy bacterial outer membrane vesicles to translocate effector proteins and virulence factors via a membrane vesicle trafficking secretory pathway, in order to modify their environment or attack/invade target cells, for example, at the host-pathogen interface.

== Diversity ==
Many pathogenic bacteria are known to have secreted effectors but for most species the exact number is unknown. Once a pathogen genome has been sequenced, effectors can be predicted based on protein sequence similarity, but such predictions are not always precise. More importantly, it is difficult to prove experimentally that a predicted effector is actually secreted into a host cell because the amount of each effector protein is tiny. For instance, Tobe et al. (2006) predicted more than 60 effectors for pathogenic E. coli but could only show for 39 that they are secreted into human Caco-2 cells. Finally, even within the same bacterial species, different strains often have different repertoires of effectors. For instance, the plant pathogen Pseudomonas syringae has 14 effectors in one strain, but more than 150 have been found in multiple different strains.

| Species | number of effectors | reference |
|---|---|---|
| Chlamydia (multiple species) | 16+ | |
| E. coli EHEC (O157:H7) | 40-60 | |
| E. coli (EPEC) | >20 | |
| Legionella pneumophila | >330 (T4SS) | |
| Pseudomonas aeruginosa | 4 | |
| Pseudomonas syringae | 14 (>150 in multiple strains) | |
| Salmonella enterica | 60+ | |
| Yersinia (multiple species) | 14 | |

== Mechanism of action ==
Given the diversity of effectors, they affect a wide variety of intracellular processes. The T3SS effectors of pathogenic E. coli, Shigella, Salmonella, and Yersinia regulate actin dynamics to facilitate their own attachment or invasion, subvert endocytic trafficking, block phagocytosis, modulate apoptotic pathways, and manipulate innate immunity as well as host responses.

Phagocytosis. Phagocytes are immune cells that can recognize and "eat" bacteria. Phagocytes recognize bacteria directly [e.g., through the so-called scavenger receptor A which recognizes bacterial lipopolysaccharide (LPS) ] or indirectly through antibodies (IgG) and complement proteins (C3bi) which coat the bacteria and are recognized by the Fcγ receptors and integrinα_{m}β_{2} (complement receptor 3). For instance, intracellular Salmonella and Shigella escape phagocytic killing through manipulation of endolysosomal trafficking (see there). Yersinia predominantly survives extracellularly using the translocation of effectors to inhibit cytoskeletal rearrangements and thus phagocytosis. EPEC/EHEC inhibit both transcytosis through M cells and internalization by phagocytes. Yersinia inhibits phagocytosis through the concerted actions of several effector proteins, including YopE which acts as a RhoGAP and inhibits Rac-dependent actin polymerization.

Endocytic trafficking. Several bacteria, including Salmonella and Shigella, enter the cell and survive intracellularly by manipulating the endocytic pathway. Once internalized by host cells Salmonella subverts the endolysosome trafficking pathway to create a Salmonella-containing vacuole (SCV), which is essential for its intracellular survival. As the SCVs mature they travel to the microtubule organizing center (MTOC), a perinuclear region adjacent to the Golgi, where they produce Salmonella induced filaments (Sifs) dependent on the T3SS effectors SseF and SseG. By contrast, internalized Shigella avoids the endolysosome system by rapidly lysing its vacuole through the action of the T3SS effectors IpaB and C although the details of this process are poorly understood.

Secretory pathway. Some pathogens, such as EPEC/EHEC disrupt the secretory pathway. For instance, their effector EspG can reduce the secretion of interleukin-8 (IL-8), and thus affect the immune system (immunomodulation). EspG functions as a Rab GTPase-activating protein (Rab-GAP), trapping Rab-GTPases in their inactive GDP bound form, and reducing ER–Golgi transport (of IL-8 and other proteins).

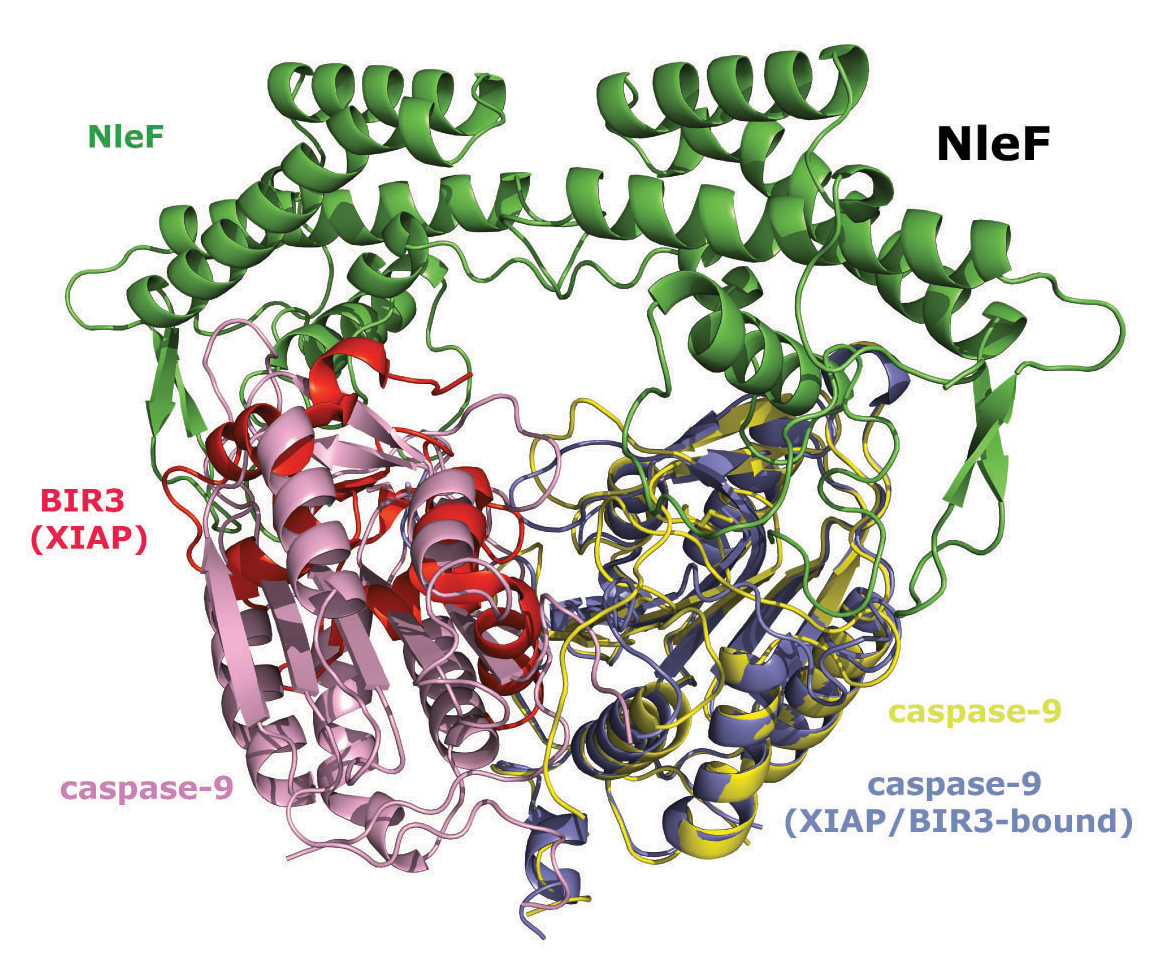
NleF bound to Caspase 9. NleF inhibits the catalytic activity of the caspases and prevents apoptosis in HeLa and Caco-2 cells.

Apoptosis (programmed cell death). Apoptosis is usually a mechanism of defense to infection, given that apoptotic cells eventually attract immune cells to remove them and the pathogen. Many pathogenic bacteria have developed mechanisms to prevent apoptosis, not the least to maintain their host environment. For instance, the EPEC/EHEC effectors NleH and NleF block apoptosis. Similarly, the Shigella effectors IpgD and OspG (a homolog of NleH) block apoptosis, the former by phosphorylating and stabilizing the double minute 2 protein (MDM2) which in turn leads to a block of NF-kB-induced apoptosis. Salmonella inhibits apoptosis and activates pro-survival signals, dependent on the effectors AvrA and SopB, respectively. Phosphorylation of caspases by the Legionella pneumophila kinase LegK3 also inhibits host programmed cell death.

Induction of cell death. In contrast to inhibition of apoptosis, several effectors appear to induce programmed cell death. For instance, EHEC effectors EspF, EspH, and Cif induce apoptosis.

Inflammatory response. Human cells have receptors that recognize pathogen-associated molecular patterns (PAMPs). When bacteria bind to these receptors, they activate signaling cascades such as the NF-kB and MAPK pathways. This leads to expression of cytokines, immunomodulating agents, such as interleukins and interferons which regulate immune response to infection and inflammation. Several bacterial effectors affect NF-kB signaling. For instance, the EPEC/EHEC effectors NleE, NleB, NleC, NleH, and Tir are immunosuppressing effectors that target proteins in the NF-kB signaling pathway. NleC has been shown to cleave the NF-kB p65 subunit (RelA), blocking the production of IL-8 following infection. NleH1, but not NleH2, blocks translocation of NF-kB into the nucleus. The Tir effector protein inhibits cytokine production. Similarly, YopE, YopP, and YopJ (in Yersinia enterocolitica, Yersinia pestis, and Yersinia pseudotuberculosis respectively) target the NF-kB pathway. YopE inhibits activation of NF-kB, which in part prevents the production of IL-8. YopJ family members are acetyltransferases that modify lysine, serine or threonine residues with an acetyl group, leading to protein aggregation, blockage of phosphorylation or inhibition of ATP binding. In plants, this kind of protein acetylation can be removed through activity of the SOBER1/TIPSY1 deacetylase family.

== Databases and online resources ==
- EffectiveDB – A database of predicted bacterial effectors. Includes an interactive server to predict effectors.
- Bacterial Effector Proteins and their domains/motifs (from Paul Dean's lab)
- T3DB – A database of Type 3 Secretion System (T3SS) proteins
- T3SE – T3SS Database
- BEAN 2.0: an integrated web resource for the identification and functional analysis of type III secreted effectors
