= Outer membrane vesicle =

Vesicles released from the outer membranes of Gram-negative bacteria

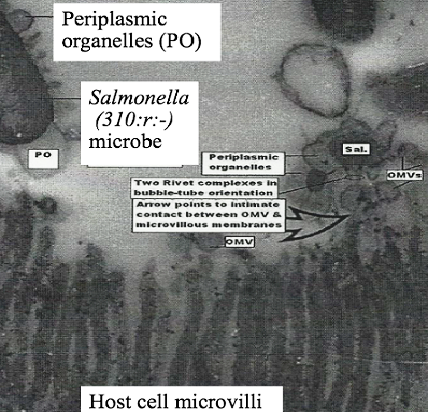
Outer membrane vesicles released in vivo by the human pathogen Salmonella in chicken ileum, as visualized by transmission electron microscopy. It illustrates a proposed mechanism in which OMVs bud from periplasmic organelles formed by type III secretion.

Outer membrane vesicles (OMVs) are vesicles released from the outer membranes of Gram-negative bacteria. While Gram-positive bacteria release vesicles as well, those vesicles fall under the broader category of bacterial membrane vesicles (MVs). OMVs were the first MVs to be discovered, and are distinguished from outer inner membrane vesicles (OIMVs), which are gram-negative bacterial vesicles containing portions of both the outer and inner bacterial membrane. In 1965, cell-free lipopolysaccharide (LPS) was detected in E. coli cultures, and in the following year electron microscopy revealed that these vesicles made of LPS were derived from the outer membrane of the bacteria. OMVs mediate stress response, cell-to-cell communication, host colonization, and immune evasion.

Gram-negative bacteria utilize their periplasm to secrete OMVs for trafficking bacterial biochemicals to target cells in their environment. OMVs also can carry endotoxic LPS that may contribute to disease processes in their host. This mechanism imparts a variety of benefits like, long-distance delivery of bacterial secretory cargo with minimized hydrolytic degradation and extra-cellular dilution, also supplemented with other supportive molecules (e.g., virulence factors) to accomplish a specific job and yet, keeping a safe-distance from the defense arsenal of the targeted cells. Biochemical signals trafficked by OMVs may vary largely during 'war and peace' situations. In 'complacent' bacterial colonies, OMVs may be used to carry DNA to 'related' microbes for genetic transformations, and also translocate cell signaling molecules for quorum sensing and biofilm formation. During 'challenge' from other cell types around, OMVs may be preferred to carry degradation and subversion enzymes. Likewise, OMVs may contain more of invasion proteins at the host–pathogen interface. It is expected that environmental factors around the secretory microbes are responsible for inducing these bacteria to synthesize and secrete specifically-enriched OMVs, physiologically suiting the immediate task. Thus, bacterial OMVs, being strong immunomodulators, can be manipulated for their immunogenic contents and utilized as potent pathogen-free vaccines for immunizing humans and animals against threatening infections. VA-MENGOC-BC and Bexsero against meningitis are currently the only OMV vaccines approved in the US, though an OMV vaccine for gonorrhea is seeking approval.. Meningitis vaccines made with OMVs use vesicles treated with detergents to minimize the burden of the lipooligosaccharide. However, this procedure has the disadvantage of altering the structure of the surface-exposed immunogenic proteins. OMVs may be purified instead from engineered bacteria lacking the genes for the synthesis of part of the LOS structure, which has been demonstrated to reduce the inflammation in a human macrophage cell line.

== Biogenesis and movement ==
Gram-negative bacteria have a double set of lipid bilayers. An inner bilayer, the inner cell membrane, encloses the cytoplasm or cytosol. Surrounding this inner cell membrane there is a second bilayer called the bacterial outer membrane. The compartment or space between these two membranes is called the periplasm or periplasmic space. In addition, there is a firm cell wall consisting of peptidoglycan layer, which surrounds the cell membrane and occupies the periplasmic space. The peptidoglycan layer provides some rigidity for maintaining the bacterial cell shape, besides also protecting the microbe against challenging environments.

The first step in biogenesis of gram-negative bacterial OMVs, is bulging of outer membrane above the peptidoglycan layer. Accumulation of phospholipids in the outside of the outer membrane is thought to be the basis of this outwards bulging of the outer membrane. This accumulation of phospholipids can be regulated by the VacJ/Yrb ABC transport system that transfers phospholipids from the outside of OM to the inner side. Additionally, environmental conditions as sulfur depletion can trigger a state of phospholipid overproduction that causes increased OMV release.

The actual release of the vesicle from the outer membrane remains unclear. It is likely that vesicle structures can be released spontaneously. Alternatively, it has been suggested that few proteins 'rivet' the outer and cell membranes together, so that the periplasmic bulge protrudes like a 'ballooned' pocket of inflated periplasm out from the surface of the outer membrane. Lateral diffusion of 'rivet complexes' may help in pinching off large bulges of periplasm as OMVs.

Bacterial membrane vesicles' dispersion along the cell surface was measured in live E. coli, a commensal bacteria common in the human gut. Antibiotic treatment altered vesicle dynamics, vesicle-to-membrane affinity, and surface properties of the cell membranes, generally enhancing vesicle transport along the surfaces of bacterial membranes and suggesting that their motion properties could be a signature of antibiotic stress. Despite this first high-resolution, quantitative tracking of bacterial OMVs, detailed experimental work is still awaited to understand the biomechanics of OMV biogenesis and transport. OMVs are also under focus of current research in exocytosis in prokaryotes via outer membrane vesicle trafficking for intra-species, inter-species and inter-kingdom cell signaling, which is slated to change our mindset on virulence of microbes, host–pathogen interactions and inter-relationships among variety of species in earth's ecosystem.

== See also ==
- Exocytosis
- Host–pathogen interactions
- Host–pathogen interface
- List of bacterial disulfide oxidoreductases
- Virulence
