= DsbC protein family =

Disulfide bond isomerase protein N-terminus
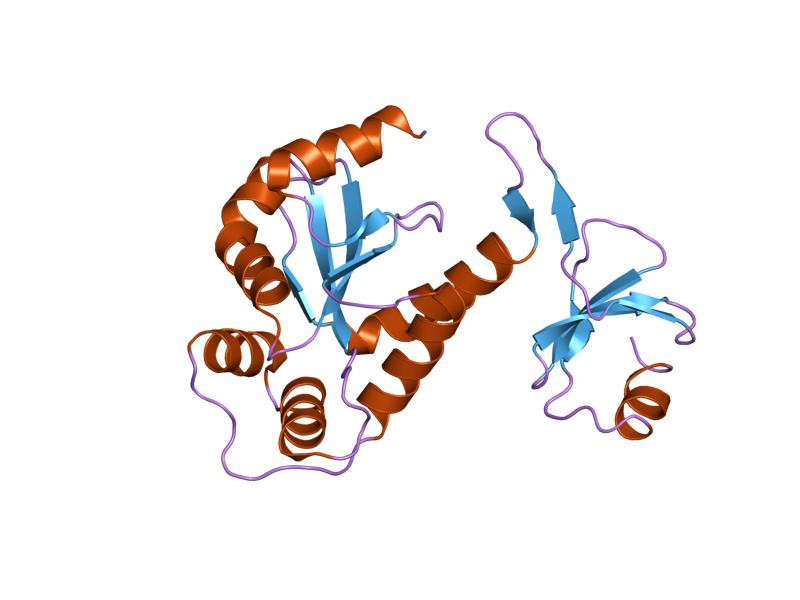
- X-ray structure of DsbC from Haemophilus influenzae

Identifiers
- Symbol: DsbC_N
- Pfam: PF10411
- InterPro: IPR018950
Available protein structures:
- PDB: IPR018950 PF10411 (ECOD; PDBsum)
- AlphaFold: IPR018950; PF10411

DsbC (Disulfide bond C) is a prokaryotic disulfide bond isomerase. The formation of native disulfide bonds play an important role in the proper folding of proteins and stabilize tertiary structures of the protein. DsbC is one of 6 proteins in the Dsb family in prokaryotes. The other proteins are DsbA, DsbB, DsbD, DsbE and DsbG. These enzymes work in tandem with each other to form disulfide bonds during the expression of proteins. DsbC and DsbG act as proofreaders of the disulfide bonds that are formed. They break non-native disulfide bonds that were formed and act as chaperones for the formation of native disulfide bonds. The isomerization of disulfide bonds occurs in the periplasm.

== Enzyme Mechanism ==
DsbA, DsbC and DsbG have a common Cys-Xxx-Xxx-Cys (Cys-Cysteine) motif in their active site, where Xxx can be any amino acid. In the periplasm, DsbA oxidizes thiols in cysteines to form disulfide bonds in proteins. DsbA receives its oxidizing potential from the cytosol through DsbB. However, the probability of forming a non-native disulfide bond increases with the number of cysteines in the protein sequence. This leads to improperly folded proteins.

DsbC and DsbG facilitate the proper folding of the protein by breaking non-native disulfide bonds. In addition to this, DsbC also shows chaperone activity. The reduced cysteine on DsbC performs a nucleophilic attack on the target non-native disulfide bond, to form an unstable disulfide bond between DsbC and the protein. Another thiolate group in the protein then attacks this unstable bond. The final result would be the formation of a native disulfide bond and the reformation of the thiolate group in DsbC. DsbG also acts with a similar mechanism, but has a higher selectivity when compared with DsbC.

Both DsbC and DsbG receive their reducing power, through DsbD, from the cytosol. DsbC and DsbG have been maintained in their reduced forms to ensure proper folding of proteins, with the formation of multiple disulfide bonds.

== Enzyme Structure ==
DsbC is a modular dimer, with two 23.3 kDa subunits. There are four cysteines in each monomer, with two present in the active site.

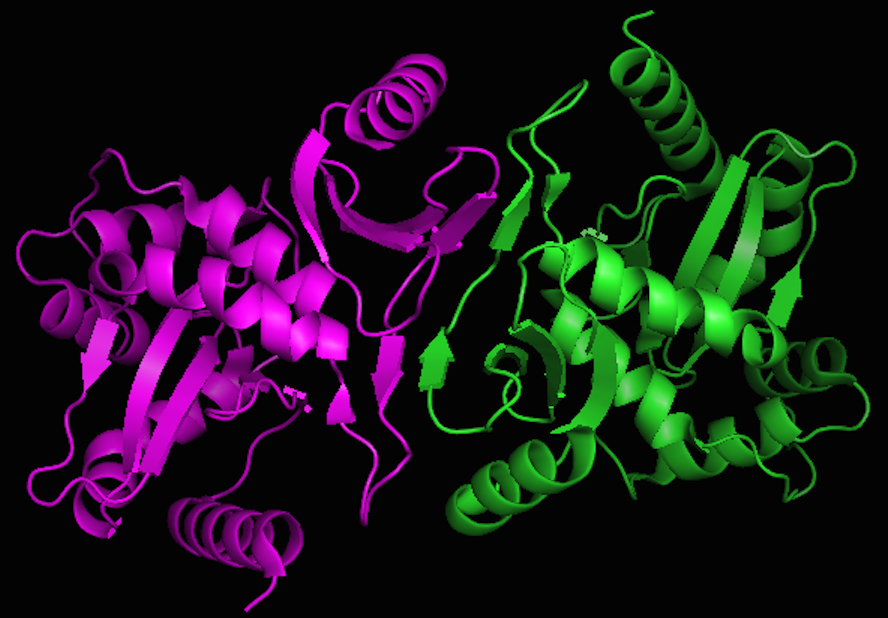
Modular dimer of DsbC. Each module shown in a different color. Generated from 1EEJ

The common motif is Cys98-Gly-Tyr-Cys101. The fact that Cys 98 is partially solvent exposed supports the mechanism provided above. DsbG has a sequence homology of 24% identity with DsbC, thus suggesting a similar structure with that of DsbC.

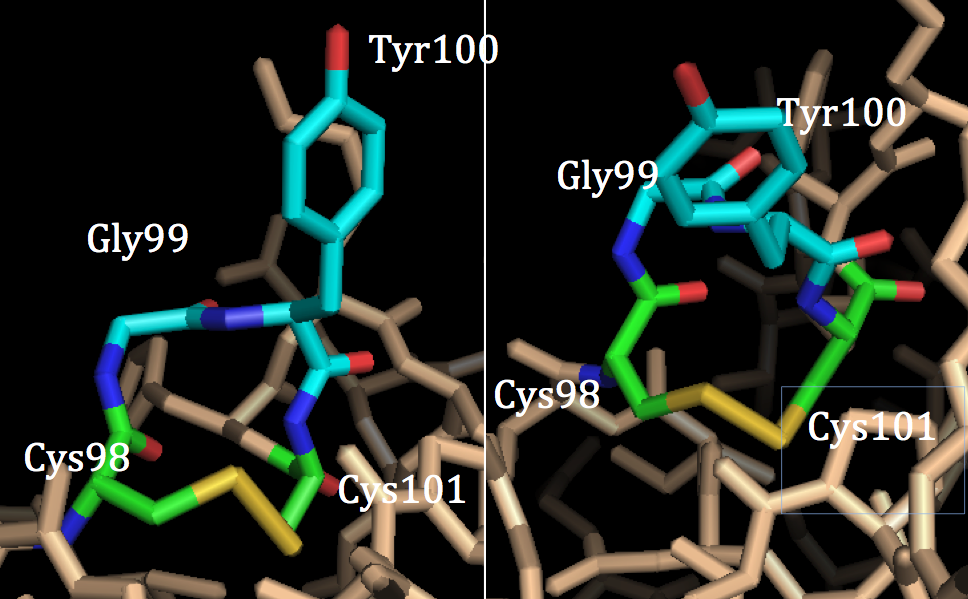
The Cys98-Gly-Tyr-Cys101 chain in DsbC. Cys backbones are shown in green, with sulfur atoms colored yellow. Note that DsbC is in an oxidized state. Generated from 1EEJ

The structure of DsbC from E. coli as reported by McCarthy et al. shows the cysteines in the oxidized state. In wild-type cells, both cysteines are in the reduced state.

== Disease Relevance ==
Synthesis of proteins with multiple disulfide bonds is challenging due to formation of non-native disulfide bonds. This usually leads to insoluble, inactive proteins. Co-expressing DsbA and DsbC has shown to help express soluble proteins with even more than five disulfide bonds. Two examples of proteins with medical applications that were expressed using this approach are the expression of reteplase in E.Coli and the functional expression of single chain Fv antibodies in E. Coli Reteplase is used in the treatment of ischemic stroke and contains 9 disulfide bonds. Prior to co-expressing the protein with DsbA and DsbC, the soluble expression in vivo was very low due to improper disulfide bond formation. Protein obtained from this co-expression system was also reported to have 20 times the thrombolytic activity than previously reported.
