= DSBC =

DSBC may refer to:

- Durham School Boat Club - a school club offering rowing to students, parents, friends and other local schools. Based at Durham School in the city of Durham, England.
- Digital Satellite Broadcasting Corporation - one of four companies that was bidding for Satellite Digital Audio Radio Service, or SDARS, licenses in the United States.
- DanceSport BC - the governing body for competitive ballroom dance in British Columbia and Yukon, Canada.
- DsbC - a protein involved in Oxidative folding.
