= Membrane vesicle trafficking =

Membrane vesicle trafficking in eukaryotic animal cells involves movement of biochemical signal molecules from synthesis-and-packaging locations in the Golgi body to specific release locations on the inside of the plasma membrane of the secretory cell. It takes place in the form of Golgi membrane-bound micro-sized vesicles, termed membrane vesicles (MVs).

In this process, the packed cellular products are released or secreted outside the cell, across its membrane. On the other hand, the vesicular membrane is retained and recycled by the secretory cells. This phenomenon has a major role in synaptic neurotransmission, endocrine secretion, mucous secretion, granular-product secretion by neutrophils, and other phenomena. The scientists behind this discovery were awarded Nobel Prize for the year 2013.

In prokaryotic, gram-negative bacterial cells, membrane vesicle trafficking is mediated through bacterial outer membrane bounded nano-sized vesicles, called outer membrane vesicles (OMVs). In this case, however, the OMV membrane is secreted as well, along with OMV-contents to outside the secretion-active bacterium. This different phenomenon has a major role in host–pathogen interactions, endotoxic shock in patients, invasion and infection of animals or plants, inter-species bacterial competition, quorum sensing, exocytosis, and other areas.

== Movement within eukaryotic cells ==
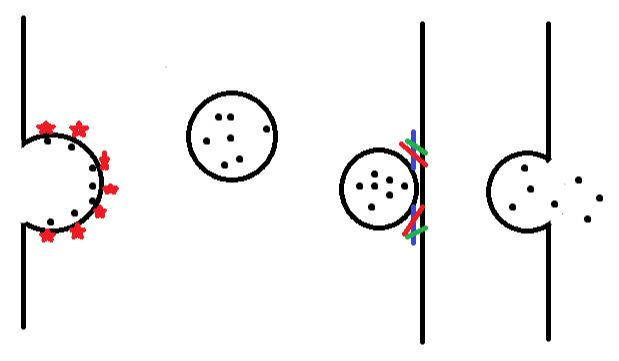
Here a vesicle forms as cargo, receptors and coat proteins gather. The vesicle then buds outwards and breaks free into the cytoplasm. The vesicle is moved towards its target location then docks and fuses.

Once vesicles are produced in the endoplasmic reticulum and modified in the Golgi body they make their way to a variety of destinations within the cell. Vesicles first leave the Golgi body and are released into the cytoplasm in a process called budding. Vesicles are then moved towards their destination by motor proteins. Once the vesicle arrives at its destination it joins with the bi-lipid layer in a process called fusion, and then releases its contents.

=== Budding ===
Receptors embedded in the membrane of the Golgi body bind specific cargo (such as dopamine) on the lumenal side of the vesicle. These cargo receptors then recruit a variety of proteins including other cargo receptors and coat proteins such as clathrin, COPI and COPII. As more and more of these coating proteins come together, they cause the vesicle to bud outward and eventually break free into the cytoplasm. The coating proteins are then shed into the cytoplasm to be recycled and reused.

=== Motility between cell compartments ===
For movement between different compartments within the cell, vesicles rely on the motor proteins myosin, kinesin (primarily anterograde transport) and dynein (primarily retrograde transport). One end of the motor proteins attaches to the vesicle while the other end attaches to either microtubulees or microfilaments. The motor proteins then move by hydrolyzing ATP, which propels the vesicle towards its destination.

=== Docking and Fusion ===
As a vesicle nears its intended location, RAB proteins in the vesicle membrane interact with docking proteins at the destination site. These docking proteins bring the vesicle in closer to interact with the SNARE Complex found in the target membrane. The SNARE complex reacts with synaptobrevin found on the vesicle membrane. This forces the vesicle membrane against the membrane of the target complex (or the outer membrane of the cell) and causes the two membranes to fuse. Depending on whether the vesicle fuses with a target complex or the outer membrane, the contents of the vesicle are then released either into the target complex or outside the cell.

=== Examples in eukaryotes ===
1. Intracellular trafficking occurs between subcellular compartments like Golgi cisternae and multivesicular endosomes for transport of soluble proteins as MVs.
2. Budding of MVs directly from plasma membrane as microvesicles released outside the secretory cells.
3. Exosomes are MVs that can form inside an internal compartment like multivesicular endosome. Exosomes are released eventually due to fusion of this endosome with plasma membrane of cell.
4. Hijacking of exosomal machinery by some viruses like retroviruses, wherein viruses bud inside multivesicular endosomes and get secreted subsequently as exosomes.

All these types (1–4) of modes of membrane vesicle trafficking, taking place in eukaryotic cells have been explained diagrammatically.

== In prokaryotes ==
Unlike in eukaryotes, membrane vesicular trafficking in prokaryotes is an emerging area in interactive biology for intra-species (quorum sensing) and inter-species signaling at the host–pathogen interface, as most prokaryotes (except anammox and cyanobacteria) lack internal membrane-compartmentalization of their cytoplasm. Bacterial outer membrane vesicle dispersion along the cell surface was measured in live Escherichia coli, commensal bacteria common in the human gut. Antibiotic treatment altered vesicle dynamics, vesicle-to-membrane affinity, and surface properties of the cell membranes, generally enhancing vesicle transport along the surfaces of bacterial membranes and suggesting that their motion properties could be a signature of antibiotic stress.

For more than four decades, cultures of gram negative bacteria revealed the presence of nanoscale membrane vesicles. A role for membrane vesicles in pathogenic processes has been suspected since the 1970s, when they were observed in gingival plaque by electron microscopy. These vesicles were suspected to promote bacterial adhesion to the host epithelial cell surface. Their role in invasion of animal host cells in vivo was then demonstrated. In inter-bacterial interactions, OMVs released by Pseudomonas aeruginosa were shown to fuse with outer membrane of other gram negative bacteria, causing their bacteriolysis; these OMVs could lyse gram-positive bacteria as well. Role of OMVs in Helicobacter pylori infection of human primary antral epithelial cells, as model that closely resembles human stomach, has also been confirmed. VacA-containing OMVs could also be detected in human gastric mucosa infected with H. pylori. Salmonella OMVs were also shown to have direct role in invasion of chicken ileal epithelial cells in vivo in the year, 1993 (ref 4) and later, in hijacking of defense macrophages into sub-service for pathogen replication and consequent apoptosis of infected macrophages in typhoid-like animal infection. These studies brought the focus on OMVs into membrane vesicle trafficking and showed this phenomenon as involved in multifarious processes including genetic transformation, quorum sensing, competition arsenal among microbes, and invasion, infection, and immuno-modulation of animal hosts. A mechanism has already been proposed for generation of OMVs by gram negative bacteria involving: expansion of pockets of periplasm (named, periplasmic organelles) due to accumulation of bacterial cell secretions and their pinching off as outer membrane bounded vesicles (OMVs) on the lines of a 'soap bubble' formation with a bubble tube, and further fusion or uptake of diffusing OMVs by host/target cells (Fig. 2).

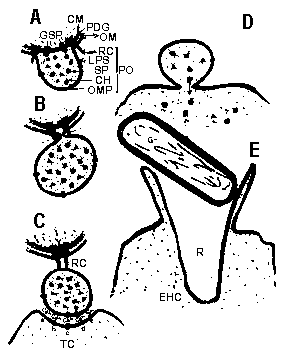
Fig. 2 Membrane vesicle trafficking Mechanism (A–E); proposed for release (stages A–C) of outer membrane vesicles, OMVs from gram-negative bacteria in analogy of soap-bubble formation from a bubble-tube assembly of rivet complexes (RC; stage C), and their translocation to animal host/target cell (TC; stage D). General secretory pathway (GSP) secretes proteins across bacterial cell membrane (CM) to bulge out lipopolysaccharide (LPS)-rich outer membrane (OM) above peptidoglycan (PDG) layer into pockets of inflated periplasm, called periplasmic organelles (PO) to pinch off OMVs containing outer membrane proteins (OMPs), secretory proteins (SP) and chaperons (CH). OMVs signal epithelial host cells (EHC) to ruffle (R) aiding macropinoctosis of gram negative (G−) microbe (stage E).

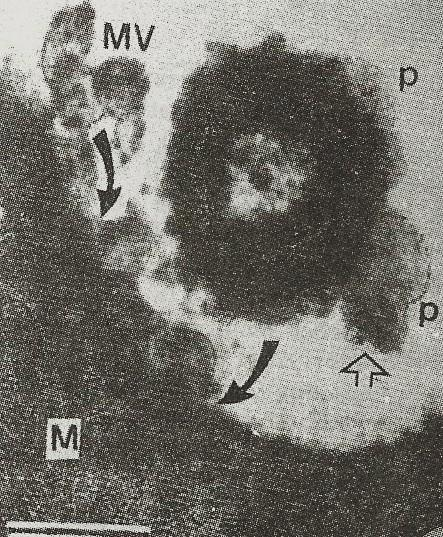
Fig. 3 Transmission electron micrograph of human Salmonella organism bearing periplasmic organelles, (p, line arrow) on its surface and releasing bacterial outer membrane vesicles (MV) being endocytosed (curved arrow) by macrophage cell (M) in chicken ileum in vivo

In conclusion, membrane vesicle trafficking via OMVs of Gram-negative organisms, cuts across species and kingdoms – including plant kingdom – in the realm of cell-to-cell signaling.

== See also ==
- Bacterial outer membrane vesicles
- Endocytosis
- Exocytosis
- Host–pathogen interaction
- Secretory pathway
- Vesicle (Biology and Chemistry)
- Virulence
