= DanceSport Alberta =

Governing body for amateur ballroom dance competition in Alberta, Canada

DanceSport Alberta is the governing body for amateur ballroom dance competition in Alberta, Canada. It is a member of the Canadian Amateur DanceSport Association.

DanceSport Alberta was founded in 1989 as a non-profit organization. In addition to Alberta, it has jurisdiction over Saskatchewan and the Northwest Territories, which do not have their own amateur associations. Prior to 1989, dancers on the Canadian prairies belonged to the Western Canadian Amateur Ballroom Dance Association (WCABDA); DanceSport Alberta was formed when the WCABDA became DanceSport BC (British Columbia and Yukon only).

The organization's monthly email newsletter is called Pivotal Times.

DanceSport Alberta sanctions several annual competitions:

- Alberta Winter Classic - Calgary Featuring the Western Canadian Open Championships. Hosted by DanceSport Alberta.
- Northern Lights Classic - Edmonton Featuring the Alberta Closed and Edmonton Open Championships. Hosted by DanceSport Alberta.
- Wild Rose Ball - Calgary Featuring the Alberta Open Championships. Hosted by Steve Van.
- Calgary Open Dance Competition - Calgary Featuring the Calgary Open Championships. Hosted by Ballroom & Country Dance Studio.
