= Richard Neutze =

New Zealand biophysicist (1969–2026)

- Born: Richard John Neutze; 5 July 1969; Mid Canterbury, New Zealand
- Died: 28 April 2026 (aged 56)
- Education: University of Canterbury
- Scientific career
- Institutions: Uppsala University; University of Gothenburg
- Thesis: Acceleration and optical interferometry (1995)
- Doctoral advisor: Geoff Stedman; William Moreau
- Other academic advisors: Janos Hajdu

Richard John Neutze (5 July 1969 – 28 April 2026) was a biophysicist from New Zealand, and a professor of biochemistry in the Department of Chemistry & Molecular Biology at the University of Gothenburg in Sweden. He has contributed to the X-ray crystallography of biomolecules, including proposing the idea of diffract before destroy with Janos Hajdu and others, which contributed to the invention of serial femtosecond crystallography.

== Education and career ==
Neutze graduated with a BSc in physics in 1991 and a PhD in biophysics in 1995 from the University of Canterbury, New Zealand, where his supervisor was Geoff Stedman. He later conducted postdoctoral research at the University of Oxford, the University of Tübingen, and Uppsala University.

== Honors and awards ==
Neutze received the Young Scientist Award at the European Synchrotron Radiation Facility in 2000, and the Hugo Theorell Prize from the Swedish Biophysics Society in 2012.
