= List of bacterial disulfide oxidoreductases =

Bacterial thiol disulfide oxidoreductases (TDOR) are bacterial enzymes that participate in redox reactions involving cysteine residues. Along with unfolded proteins, they are secreted from bacterial cells into periplasmic spaces or extracellularly, and may have membrane anchors. Some have functions in promoting processes of adhesion and biofilm development, and generally disease development.

== Table ==
Enzyme name	Meaning	Bacteria	Catalytic site
DsbA	D disulfide bond A	various incl. Staphylococcus aureus	CXXC
DsbA	D disulfide bond A	Escherichia coli	CPHC
BdbA–D		Bacillus subtilis	
MdbA		Actinomyces oris, Corynebacterium diphtheriae	CPHC
SdbA		Streptococcus gordonii	
