= Jenny Martin =

Jenny Martin may refer to:

- Jenny Beth Martin, co-founder and national coordinator of the Tea Party Patriots
- Jennifer L. Martin, Australian scientist
- Jenny Martin (All My Children)
