= BDBC =

BDBC may refer to:

- Basingstoke and Deane Borough Council
- Bluecoats Drum and Bugle Corps, a competitive junior drum and bugle corps
- Business Development Bank of Canada, a Canadian federal bank
- Disulfide bond formation protein C, a protein
