= Canada DanceSport =

Governing body for competitive dancing in Canada

Canada DanceSport (CDS) is the governing body for Dancesport in Canada, with disciplines including competitive ballroom dancing and breakdancing. It has been a member of the World DanceSport Federation since 1979 and is recognized by the Canadian Olympic Committee. CDS sanctions the annual Canadian Closed Championships.

CDS organized Team Canada's breakdancing team for international competition such as the discipline's debut at the 2023 Pan-American Games.

Within Canada, CDS has several regional associations:

- Danse Sport Québec (DSQ)
- DanceSport Alberta (DSAB)
- DanceSport Atlantic Association (DAA)
- DanceSport BC (DSBC)
- Ontario DanceSport (ODS)
