= Louise Johnson =

British biochemist and crystallographer 1940–2012

Dame Louise Johnson DBE FRS
- Born: Louise Napier Johnson; 26 September 1940
- Died: 25 September 2012 (aged 71)
- Education: Wimbledon High School for Girls
- Alma mater: University College London (BSc, PhD)
- Known for: Discovering the structure of lysozyme and N-Acetylglucosamine
- Spouse: Abdus Salam (m. 1968; died 1996)
- Children: 2
- Awards: Dame Commander of the Order of the British Empire
- Scientific career
- Institutions: University of Oxford
- Thesis: An X-ray crystallographic study of N-acetylglucosamine and its relation to lysozyme. (1965)
- Doctoral advisor: David Chilton Phillips
- Other academic advisors: Frederic M. Richards
- Doctoral students: David Barford; Jenny Martin; David J. Owen
- Other notable students: Janos Hajdu

Dame Louise Napier Johnson, DBE FRS (26 September 1940 – 25 September 2012), was a British biochemist and protein crystallographer. She was David Phillips Professor of Molecular Biophysics at the University of Oxford from 1990 to 2007, and later an emeritus professor. She was married to Pakistani nuclear physicist and a Nobel Prize-laureate Abdus Salam.

== Education ==
Johnson attended Wimbledon High School for Girls from 1952 to 1959, where girls were encouraged to study science and to pursue useful careers. Her mother had read biochemistry and physiology at University College London in the 1930s and was supportive of Johnson's decision to pursue a scientific career. She went to University College London in 1959 to read Physics and coming from an all-girls school, she was surprised to find herself one of only four girls in a class of 40.

She took theoretical physics as her third-year option and graduated with a 2.1 degree. Whilst working at the Atomic Energy Authority, Harwell, on neutron diffraction, during one of her vacations, she met Uli Arndt, an instrument scientist, who worked at the Royal Institution, London. She was impressed by the work taking place there and in 1962 she moved to the Royal Institution to do a PhD in biophysics. Her graduate supervisor was David Chilton Phillips, whose team was working on the crystal structure of lysozyme. Her first task was to determine the structure of a sugar molecule, N-Acetylglucosamine, using x-ray diffraction, which she solved within a year. She then moved onto the study of the substrate binding to the protein lysozyme and was part of the team, that discovered the structure of the enzyme lysozyme; this was the third protein structure ever solved by x-ray crystallography, and the first enzyme. She was awarded her PhD in 1965.

== Career ==
After her PhD, she moved to the laboratory of Frederic M. Richards at Yale University for postdoctoral research in 1966. At Yale she worked as part of a team with Frederic M. Richards and Hal Wyckoff on the crystal structure of another enzyme, ribonuclease, which was solved shortly after she left: the fourth protein structure solved.

After her post-doctoral year at Yale, she returned to the UK in 1967 and took up the post of Departmental Demonstrator in the Department of Zoology, University of Oxford. The Professor of Zoology, J.W.R. Pringle, saw zoology as extending from animal studies to molecular studies, and had been partly responsible for bringing David Phillips to Oxford as Professor of Molecular Biophysics. Johnson was able to combine teaching with independent research and continued her work on lysozyme and new crystal studies on other enzymes. In 1972 she received some crystals of glycogen phosphorylase from rabbit muscle and this was the beginning of a major chapter in her research career. She began a detailed x-ray crystallographic analysis of the protein, which was eight times larger than lysozyme and much larger than any of the other proteins whose structures had been solved at that time.

In 1973 she was appointed University Lecturer, a post which was associated with Somerville College, Oxford. She became an Additional Fellow of the college and the Janet Vaughan Lecturer. She was now able to expand her team of graduate students and post-doctoral researchers. The phosphorylase work developed and by 1978 the team had discovered its structure and were able to work on its biological control properties. Glycogen phosphorylase is found in muscle, where it mobilises the energy store of glycogen, providing fuel which sustains muscle contraction. In resting muscle the enzyme is inactive, which prevents wasteful degradation of the fuel, but in response to nervous or hormonal signals the enzyme is switched on almost simultaneously, becoming able to generate the energy supply. Her research was directed towards understanding the molecular basis of the biological properties of control and catalytic mechanism. Her team used the bright x-ray source generated at the Synchrotron Radiation Source at Daresbury, which provided data that could not be obtained with the home source. She was David Phillips Professor in Molecular Biophysics, University of Oxford, in 1990–2007.

Johnson's lab at Oxford solved and studied many other protein structures, and she is a depositor on 100 PDB entries including many forms of glycogen phosphorylase and of cell cycle CDK/cyclin complexes As well as carrying out cutting-edge research, she nurtured numerous careers, training a generation of crystallographers in Oxford who themselves now train future leaders across the world. Together with Tom Blundell, she wrote an influential textbook on protein crystallography. She was Director of Life Sciences at Diamond Light Source, 2003–2008, and was a Fellow of Diamond Light Source, 2008–2012. Diamond Light Source is the UK's national synchrotron facility at Harwell, Oxfordshire.

=== Honours ===
She was appointed Dame Commander of the Order of the British Empire (DBE) in 2003. She was a Fellow of Corpus Christi College, Oxford and an Honorary Fellow of Somerville College, Oxford. She received a number of honorary degrees, including: Hon DSc University of St Andrews, 1992; Hon DSc University of Bath, 2004; Hon DSc Imperial College London, 2009; Hon DSc University of Cambridge, 2010. She was elected a Fellow of the Royal Society (FRS) in 1990; an Associate Fellow of the Third World Academy of Science, 2000; a Foreign Associate of the US National Academy of Sciences, 2011.

== Personal life ==
Louise Napier Johnson was born on 26 September 1940 at South Bank Nursing Home, Worcester, as the second of three daughters of George Edmund Johnson (1904–1992), a wool broker then serving in the Royal Air Force, and his wife, Elizabeth Minna, née King (1914–1992). The family was living at White Cottage, Rushwick, near Worcester, at the time.

Johnson married the Pakistani theoretical physicist Abdus Salam in 1968. He later shared the Nobel Prize for Physics in 1979 for his work on electroweak unification. They had two children: a son born in 1974 and a daughter born in 1982. Johnson's husband died in 1996. She died on 25 September 2012 in Cambridge, England, one day before her 72nd birthday.
