= Virulence =

Severity of disease pathogens on its host

Virulence is a pathogen's or microorganism's ability to cause damage to a host.

In most cases, especially in animal systems, virulence refers to the degree of damage caused by a microbe to its host. The pathogenicity of an organism—its ability to cause disease—is determined by its virulence factors. In the specific context of gene for gene systems, often in plants, virulence refers to a pathogen's ability to infect a resistant host. Virulence can also be transferred using a plasmid.

The noun virulence (Latin noun virulentia) derives from the adjective virulent, meaning disease severity. The word virulent derives from the Latin word virulentus, meaning 'a poisoned wound' or 'full of poison'. The term virulence does not only apply to viruses.

From an ecological standpoint, virulence is the loss of fitness induced by a parasite upon its host. Virulence can be understood in terms of proximate causes—those specific traits of the pathogen that help make the host ill—and ultimate causes—the evolutionary pressures that lead to virulent traits occurring in a pathogen strain.

== Virulent bacteria ==
The ability of bacteria to cause disease is described in terms of the number of infecting bacteria, the route of entry into the body, the effects of host defense mechanisms, and intrinsic characteristics of the bacteria called virulence factors. Many virulence factors are so-called effector proteins that are injected into the host cells by specialized secretion apparati, such as the type three secretion system. Host-mediated pathogenesis is often important because the host can respond aggressively to infection with the result that host defense mechanisms do damage to host tissues while the infection is being countered (e.g., cytokine storm).

The virulence factors of bacteria are typically proteins or other molecules that are synthesized by enzymes. These proteins are coded for by genes in chromosomal DNA, bacteriophage DNA or plasmids. Certain bacteria employ mobile genetic elements and horizontal gene transfer. Therefore, strategies to combat certain bacterial infections by targeting these specific virulence factors and mobile genetic elements have been proposed. Bacteria use quorum sensing to synchronise release of the molecules. These are all proximate causes of morbidity in the host.

=== Methods by which bacteria cause disease ===
Adhesion
Many bacteria must first bind to host cell surfaces. Many bacterial and host molecules that are involved in the adhesion of bacteria to host cells have been identified. Often, the host cell surface receptors for bacteria are essential proteins for other functions. Due to the presence of mucus lining and of anti-microbial substances around some host cells, it is difficult for certain pathogens to establish direct contact-adhesion.
Colonization
Some virulent bacteria produce special proteins that allow them to colonize parts of the host body. Helicobacter pylori is able to survive in the acidic environment of the human stomach by producing the enzyme urease. Colonization of the stomach lining by this bacterium can lead to gastric ulcers and cancer. The virulence of various strains of Helicobacter pylori tends to correlate with the level of production of urease.
Invasion
Some virulent bacteria produce proteins that either disrupt host cell membranes or stimulate their own endocytosis or macropinocytosis into host cells. These virulence factors allow the bacteria to enter host cells and facilitate entry into the body across epithelial tissue layers at the body surface.
Immune response inhibitors
Many bacteria produce virulence factors that inhibit the host's immune system defenses. For example, a common bacterial strategy is to produce proteins that bind host antibodies. The polysaccharide capsule of Streptococcus pneumoniae inhibits phagocytosis of the bacterium by host immune cells.
Toxins
Many virulence factors are proteins made by bacteria that poison host cells and cause tissue damage. For example, there are many food poisoning toxins produced by bacteria that can contaminate human foods. Some of these can remain in "spoiled" food even after cooking and cause illness when the contaminated food is consumed. Other bacterial toxins are chemically altered and inactivated by the heat of cooking.

== Virulent viruses ==
Virus virulence factors allow it to replicate, modify host defenses, and spread within the host, and they are toxic to the host.

They determine whether infection occurs and how severe the resulting viral disease symptoms are. Viruses often require receptor proteins on host cells to which they specifically bind. Typically, these host cell proteins are endocytosed and the bound virus then enters the host cell. Virulent viruses such as HIV, which causes AIDS, have mechanisms for evading host defenses. HIV infects T-helper cells, which leads to a reduction of the adaptive immune response of the host and eventually leads to an immunocompromised state. Death results from opportunistic infections secondary to disruption of the immune system caused by AIDS. Some viral virulence factors confer ability to replicate during the defensive inflammation responses of the host such as during virus-induced fever. Many viruses can exist inside a host for long periods during which little damage is done. Extremely virulent strains can eventually evolve by mutation and natural selection within the virus population inside a host. The term neurovirulent is used for viruses such as rabies and herpes simplex which can invade the nervous system and cause disease there.

Extensively studied model organisms of virulent viruses include virus T4 and other T-even bacteriophages which infect Escherichia coli and a number of related bacteria.

The lytic life cycle of virulent bacteriophages is contrasted by the temperate lifecycle of temperate bacteriophages.

== See also ==
- Host–pathogen interaction
- Membrane vesicle trafficking
- Bacterial effector protein
- Infectious disease
- Law of declining virulence – Disproved hypothesis of epidemiologist Theobald Smith
- Optimal virulence
- Super-spreader
- Theory of virulence – Theory by biologist Paul W. Ewald
- Verotoxin-producing Escherichia coli
- Virulence factor
- Antivirulence
