= Lori Passmore =

Canadian/British scientist

Lori Passmore FRS
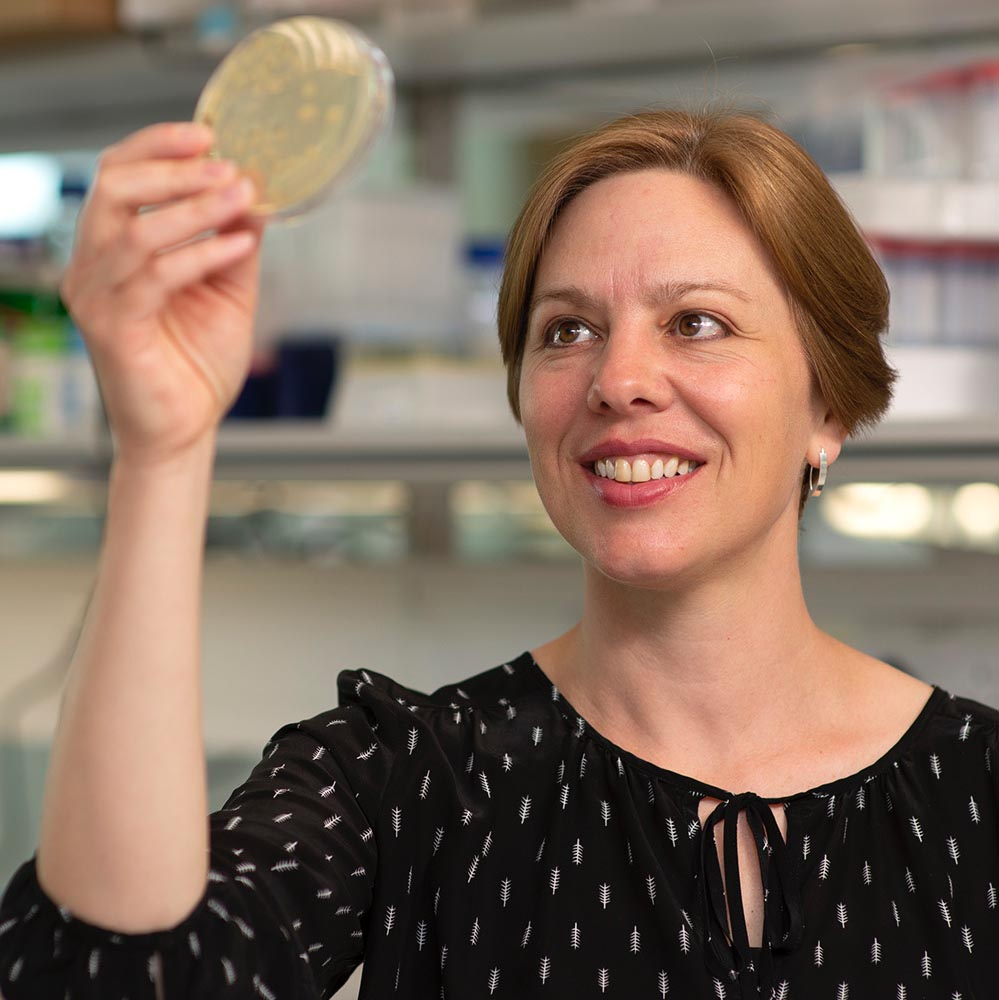
- Born: Lori Anne Passmore
- Education: University of British Columbia (BSc); University of London (PhD)
- Awards: Suffrage Science award (2016); EMBO Member (2018)
- Scientific career
- Fields: Structural biology; CryoEM; RNA processing
- Workplaces: Institute of Cancer Research (ICR); Laboratory of Molecular Biology (LMB)
- Thesis: Structural and functional studies of the anaphase promoting complex (APC) (2003)
- Doctoral advisor: David Barford
- Other academic advisors: Venki Ramakrishnan; Richard Henderson
- Website: www2.mrc-lmb.cam.ac.uk/groups/passmore

Lori Anne Passmore FRS is a Canadian/British cryo electron microscopist and structural biologist who works at the Medical Research Council (MRC) Laboratory of Molecular Biology (LMB) at the University of Cambridge. Since 2024 she has served as Joint Head of the LMB's Structural Studies Division. She is known for her work on multiprotein complexes involved in gene expression and development of new supports for cryo-EM.

== Education ==
Lori Passmore graduated from the University of British Columbia, Canada in 1999. She obtained a PhD in 2003 from University of London for research supervised by David Barford at the Institute of Cancer Research. She performed in vitro biochemical characterisation of the activity of the anaphase-promoting complex (APC) and used cryo-EM to study the APC structure.

== Career and research ==
Passmore worked as a postdoctoral researcher at the MRC-LMB. She worked with Venki Ramakrishnan and Richard Henderson, using cryo-EM to determine the structure of the eukaryotic ribosome bound to initiation factors. Passmore became a group leader at the MRC-LMB in 2009. Her group uses in vitro reconstitution, biochemical assays and cryo-EM to understand the function of multiprotein complexes that regulate gene expression at the level of mRNA. Her group has developed new sample grids for cryo-EM that reduce specimen movement during imaging. In collaboration with Ketan J. Patel, Passmore is also actively studying the molecular mechanisms underlying Fanconi anemia.

== Grants, awards and honours ==
- 2005 Beit Memorial Fellowship for Medical Research
- 2009 Fellow of Clare Hall, Cambridge
- 2010 European Research Council (ERC) starting grant
- 2015 EMBO Young Investigator Program
- 2016 Suffrage Science award
- 2017 ERC consolidator grant
- 2018 Member, European Molecular Biology Organisation (EMBO)
- 2023 Elected Fellow of the Royal Society
