= SOBER1 =

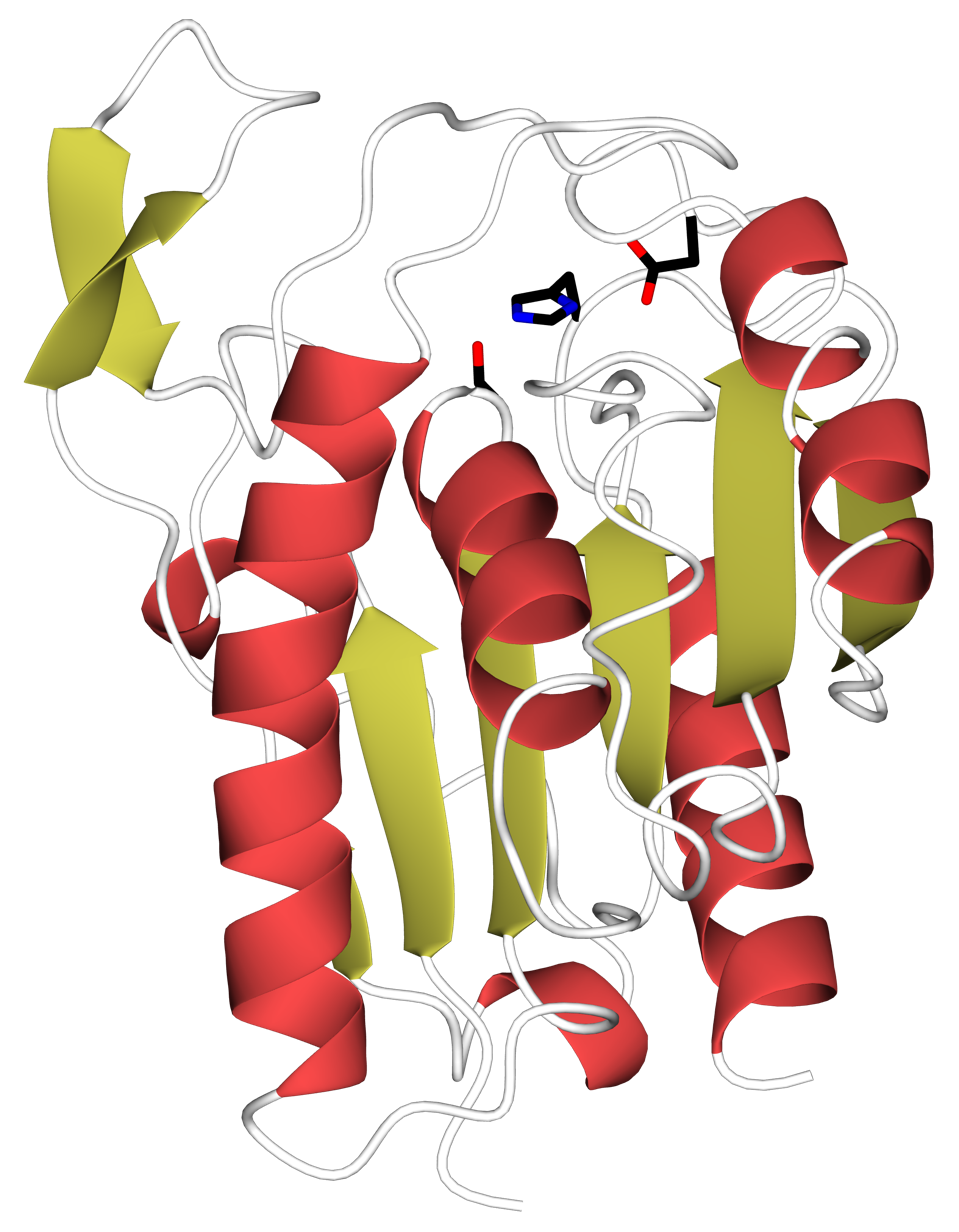
- Crystal structure of Arabidopsis thaliana SOBER1, PDB code 6avv. Alpha helices are in red, beta strands in gold, catalytic site residues in black.

Identifiers
- Symbol: SOBER1
- InterPro: IPR029058
- CATH: 6avv
- SCOP2: 6avv / SCOPe / SUPFAM
Available protein structures:
- PDB: IPR029058
- AlphaFold: IPR029058

SOBER1 is an enzyme that catalyzes the biochemical reaction of deacetylation. The SOBER (Suppressor of AvrBsT-elicited resistance) 1 protein is conserved in plants and it suppresses the plant's ability to carry out the hypersensitive response against infection by certain pathogenic effector proteins from the YopJ family. SOBER1 belongs to the protein superfamily of α/β hydrolases and possesses a canonical serine/histidine/aspartate catalytic triad to carry out the deacetylation reaction. There have been contradicting reports about SOBER1's potential phospholipase activity, with one study claiming phospholipase A_{2} activity of the protein and another study being unable to reproduce this result.

== Relationship to acyl-protein thioesterases ==
Members of the SOBER1 family are considered closely related to acyl-protein thioesterases, judged by their protein structure. However, a change in their amino acid sequence renders SOBER1's biochemical properties into a deacetylase; in particular the hydrophobic tunnel, which is found in acyl-protein thioesterases, is impaired by additional amino acids in the lid structure of SOBER1, creating a new surface for binding of the acetyl group.

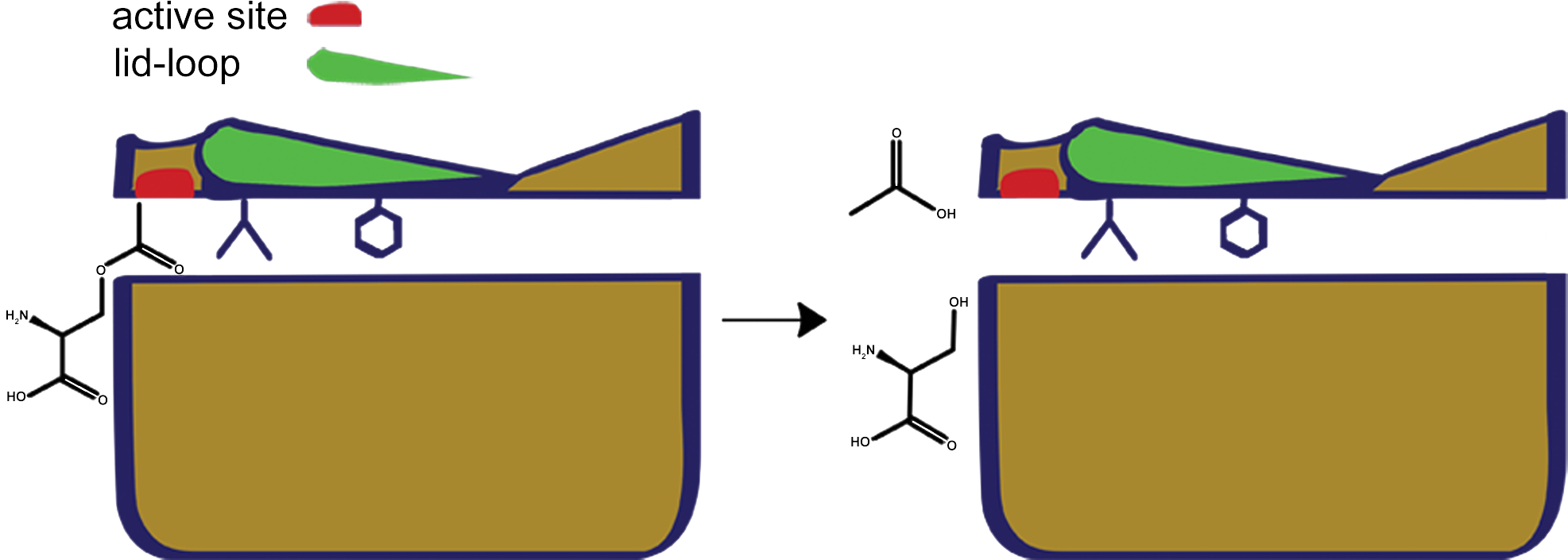
Mechanism of SOBER1 deacetylase function, highlighting the additional amino acids in the protein lid. Nature Communications 8(1):2201, Creative Commons Attribution 4.0 International License, https://creativecommons.org/licenses/by/4.0/

== Targets ==
So far, the following proteins have been identified as SOBER1 targets: AvrBsT; ACIP1.

== See also ==
- Acylation
- Catalytic triad
- Compendium of protein lysine acetylation
- Enzyme assay
- Organic synthesis
- Protein dynamics
- Proteolysis
- The Proteolysis Map
