= David Barford =

British medical researcher

David Barford FRS FMedSci
- Education: University of Bristol; University of Oxford
- Awards: EMBO Member (2003); Colworth Medal (1998)
- Scientific career
- Workplaces: MRC Laboratory of Molecular Biology; Institute of Cancer Research; University of Oxford; Cold Spring Harbor Laboratory; University of Dundee
- Thesis: Crystallographic studies on glycogen phosphorylase b (1988)
- Doctoral advisor: Louise Johnson
- Doctoral students: Lori Passmore,
- Website: www2.mrc-lmb.cam.ac.uk/group-leaders/a-to-g/david-barford/

David Barford is a British medical researcher and structural biologist at the MRC Laboratory of Molecular Biology Cambridge, UK.

== Education ==
Barford studied Biochemistry at the University of Bristol. and then went on to earn a Doctor of Philosophy from the University of Oxford, supervised by Professor Dame Louise Johnson.

== Career and research ==
Barford worked at the University of Oxford with Dame Professor Louise Johnson (1987 to 1990), and then from 1990 to 1991 at the University of Dundee Medical Research Council (MRC) Protein Phosphorylation Unit with Professor Sir Philip Cohen FRS and Tricia Cohen. He was a Cold Spring Harbor Laboratory Fellow at Cold Spring Harbor Laboratory, USA (1991 to 1994). From 1994 he was University Lecturer at the University of Oxford and Fellow of Somerville College, Oxford. In 1999 he was appointed as Professor of Molecular Biology at the Institute of Cancer Research in London. In 2013 Barford was appointed as a group leader at the MRC Laboratory of Molecular Biology, Cambridge. He was Joint Head of the Division of Structural Studies from Dec 2015 to Oct 2024.

He was a member of the Faculty of 1000 from 2002 to 2004.

=== Awards ===
- 2017 Honorary DSc University of Bristol
- 2006 Fellow of the Royal Society
- 2003 Fellow of the Academy of Medical Sciences
- 2003 Member, European Molecular Biology Organisation (EMBO)
- 1998 Colworth Medal of the Biochemical Society
