= Geoff Stedman =

New Zealand physicist (1943–2026)

- Born: Geoffrey Ernest Stedman; 1 April 1943; Christchurch, New Zealand
- Died: 3 May 2026 (aged 83); Christchurch, New Zealand
- Education: University of Canterbury; Queen Mary College, University of London
- Known for: Ring lasers
- Spouse: Rachel Dodd (m. 1969)
- Children: 1
- Awards: Hector Medal (1994)
- Scientific career
- Fields: Physics
- Workplaces: University of Canterbury
- Thesis: Ion-lattice interactions in rare earth salts (1968)
- Doctoral advisor: D.J. Newman
- Doctoral students: Richard Neutze

Geoffrey Ernest Stedman (1 April 1943 – 3 May 2026) was a New Zealand physicist, with research interests including the foundations of relativity, symmetry in quantum mechanics, and ring lasers.

== Early life and education ==
Born in Christchurch on 1 April 1943, Stedman was the son of Silas and Eleanor Stedman. He was educated at Christchurch West High School, and studied at the University of Canterbury, graduating with a BSc(Hons) degree in physics in 1965. He subsequently undertook doctoral studies at Queen Mary College, University of London, where he earned his PhD under Douglas Newman in 1969.

In 1969, Stedman married Rachel Ann Dodd in Barnstaple, Devon, and the couple went on to have one child.

== Career ==
After post-doctoral research at Queen Mary, Stedman returned to lecture at the University of Canterbury in 1971. During his career, he focused on a range of research areas, but he was particularly interested in ring lasers from the 1980s onward. In collaboration with the Technical University of Munich, Stedman and his team built a series of ring lasers in the Cashmere Caverns. The lasers, regarded as some of the most sensitive and advanced in the world, were able to detect earthquakes around the world, and were also used to investigate variations in the earth's rotation.

Stedman taught undergraduate papers across physics, from applied physics to theoretical and mathematical physics. He was instrumental in the introduction of physics papers aimed at arts students. Of his career, Stedman said at his retirement:

"It was absolutely a thrill to help and educate young people and be involved in their decisions. It's been a very great privilege."

He was elected a Fellow of the Royal Society of New Zealand in 1989, and in 1994 he won the society's Hector Medal. He was awarded the Canterbury Research Medal in 2001.

Stedman retired in 2003, having published over 160 scientific papers, and was granted the title of emeritus professor.

== Later life ==
In retirement, Stedman lived in Christchurch, and continued to work part-time at the university. He died at a care home in the suburb of Sydenham, on 3 May 2026, at the age of 83.

== Selected publications ==
=== Books ===
- Stedman, Geoffrey E. (2012). An orthodox understanding of the Bible with physical science (Updated ed.). Houston, TX: Strategic Book Publishing. ISBN 978-1-61897-449-5. OCLC 826821854.
- Stedman, Geoffrey E. (2015). Light Revolutions. Xlibris Corp. ISBN 978-1-4931-3776-3. OCLC 943689919.
- Stedman, Geoffrey E. (2010). Diagram Techniques in Group Theory. Cambridge University Press. ISBN 978-0-521-11970-2. OCLC 401146935.

=== Papers ===
- Stedman, G. E. "Ring-laser tests of fundamental physics and geophysics." Reports on progress in physics 60, no. 6 (1997): 615.
- Pancha, Aasha, T. H. Webb, G. E. Stedman, D. P. McLeod, and K. U. Schreiber. "Ring laser detection of rotations from teleseismic waves." Geophysical Research Letters 27, no. 21 (2000): 3553–3556.
- Rowe, Clive H., Ulrich K. Schreiber, Steven J. Cooper, B. Tom King, Morrie Poulton, and Geoffrey E. Stedman. "Design and operation of a very large ring laser gyroscope." Applied optics 38, no. 12 (1999): 2516–2523.
- Schreiber, Ulrich K., Clive H. Rowe, Douglas N. Wright, Steven J. Cooper, and Geoffrey E. Stedman. "Precision stabilization of the optical frequency in a large ring laser gyroscope." Applied optics 37, no. 36 (1998): 8371–8381.
