= Jennifer L. Martin =

Australian molecular biologist

Jenny Martin
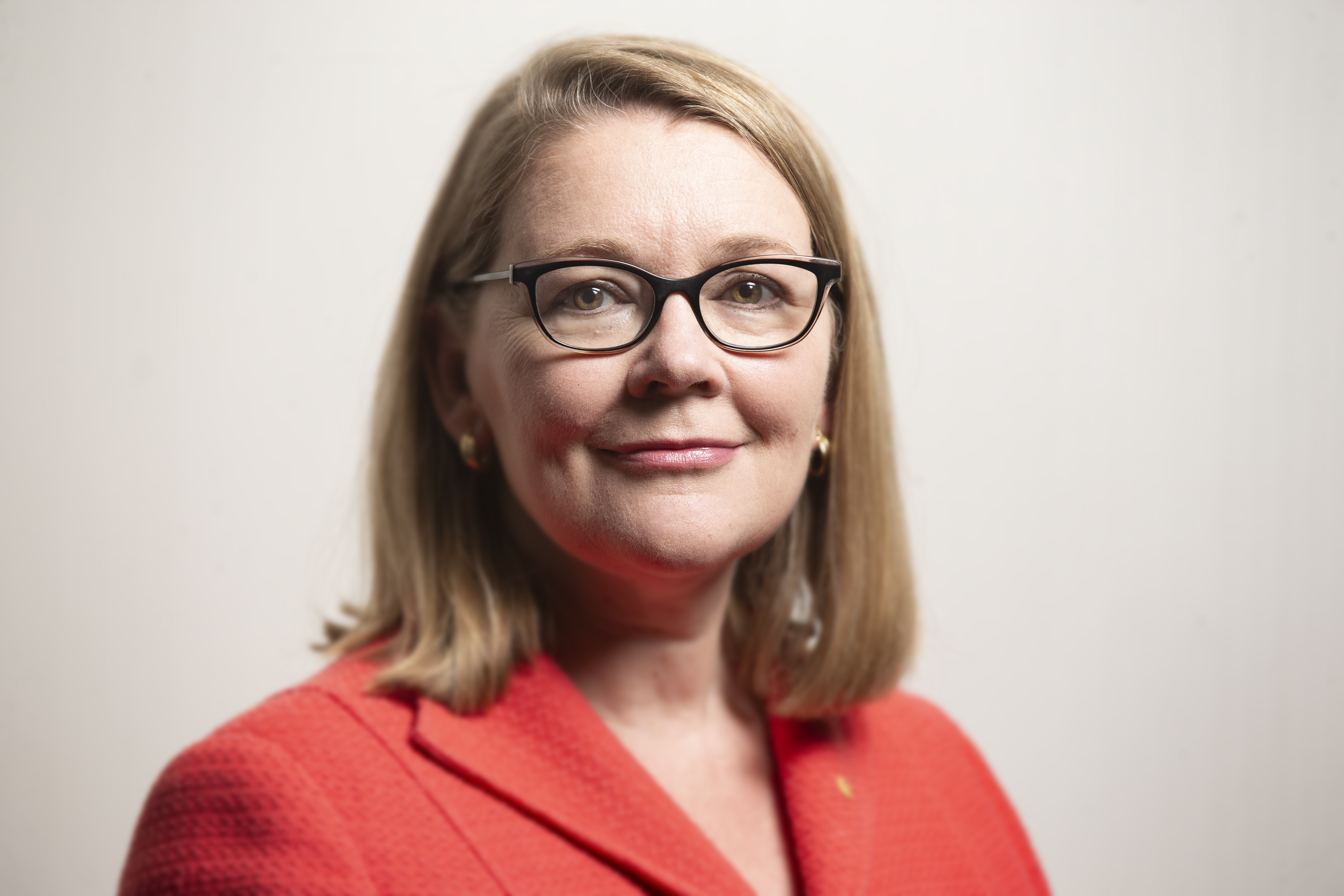
- Professor Jennifer L Martin AC FAA
- Education: Victorian College of Pharmacy (B Pharm, M Pharm); Oxford University (PhD); London Business School
- Scientific career
- Workplaces: Victorian College of Pharmacy; University of Oxford; Bond University; Rockefeller University; University of Queensland; Griffith University; University of Wollongong
- Doctoral advisor: Peter Goodford; Louise Johnson

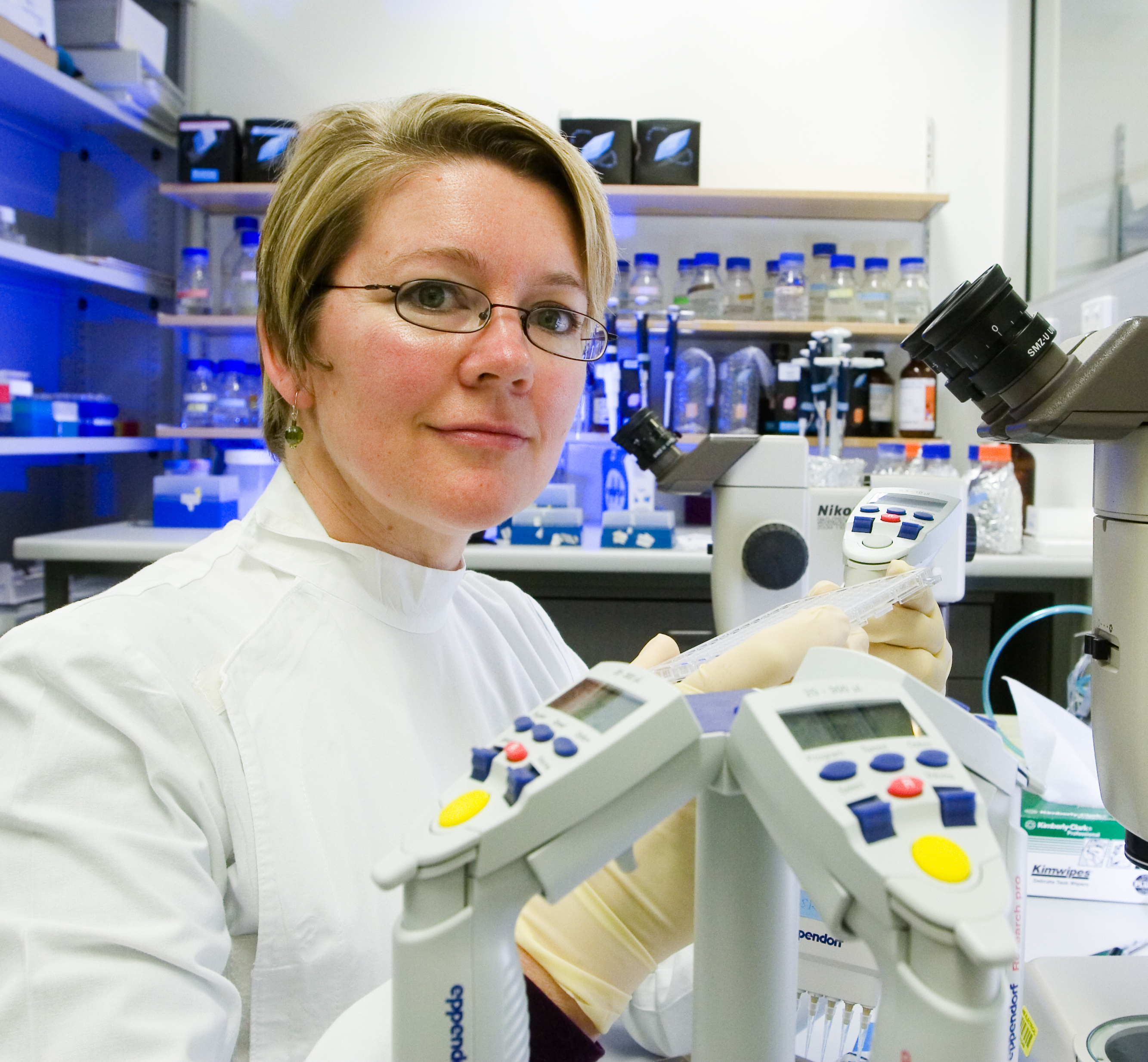
Jenny Martin in IMB UQ lab

Professor Jennifer Louise "Jenny" Martin AC FAA is an Australian molecular biologist and academic. She was the Deputy Vice-Chancellor (Research and Innovation) at the University of Wollongong, in New South Wales from 2019–2022. She is a former director of the Griffith Institute for Drug Discovery at Griffith University. and a former Australian Research Council Laureate Fellow at the Institute for Molecular Bioscience, University of Queensland. Martin is Professor Emerita at the University of Queensland and Adjunct Professor at Griffith University. Her research expertise encompasses structural biology, protein crystallography, protein interactions and their applications in drug design and discovery.

== Education ==
Martin completed a Bachelor of Pharmacy at the Victorian College of Pharmacy in Melbourne from 1979 to 1981, receiving the Gold Medal for the best student in the B Pharm course. After spending a year as a trainee pharmacist, she completed a Masters in Pharmacy, supervised by Professor Peter Andrews, on the application of computational chemistry to opioid analgesics, which led to her first scientific publications. She left Australia in 1986 to undertake a DPhil at the University of Oxford supported by a Royal Commission for the Exhibition of 1851 Science Research Scholarship and four other scholarships and bursaries. Under the guidance of Professors Peter Goodford and Louise Johnson, her research used protein crystallography to design glycogen phosphorylase inhibitors as potential anti-diabetic compounds. Martin paid tribute to Louise Johnson's positive influence as a woman in science, in a 2012 memorial. In 2015, Martin completed the London Business School four-week Senior Executive Programme as part of a cohort of 50 industry, government, not-for-profit and academic leaders from around the world.

== Scientific career ==
After completing her DPhil at Oxford, Martin returned to Australia to take up a post-doctoral position at Bond University in 1990. However, the unexpected closure of the School of Science and Technology resulted in her leaving Australia in 1991 for a post-doctoral position with Professor John Kuriyan, a structural biologist, at Rockefeller University in New York to work on the disulfide bond forming family of proteins (DSBs) in Escherichia coli. She solved the structure of the DsbA protein which was published in 1993 in the high impact journal Nature.

DsbA crystals growing in a drop of protein solution

In 1993, Martin received an ARC Queen Elizabeth II Fellowship. This enabled her to return to Australia and establish the first protein crystallography lab in Queensland. This now operates as the UQ Remote Operation Crystallisation and X-ray Diffraction (UQ ROCX) Facility, of which Martin was the Foundation Director. She remained at the University of Queensland until 2015, supported by several other fellowships: an Australian Research Council (ARC) Senior Research Fellowship in 1999, and a National Health and Medical Research Council (NHMRC) Senior Research Fellowship in 2007. In 2009, Martin was one of just 15 researchers, and only two women, to receive an inaugural ARC Australian Laureate Fellowship. In 2016, Martin was appointed Director of the Eskitis Drug Discovery Institute at Griffith University, which hosts unique drug discovery resources including Compounds Australia and NatureBank

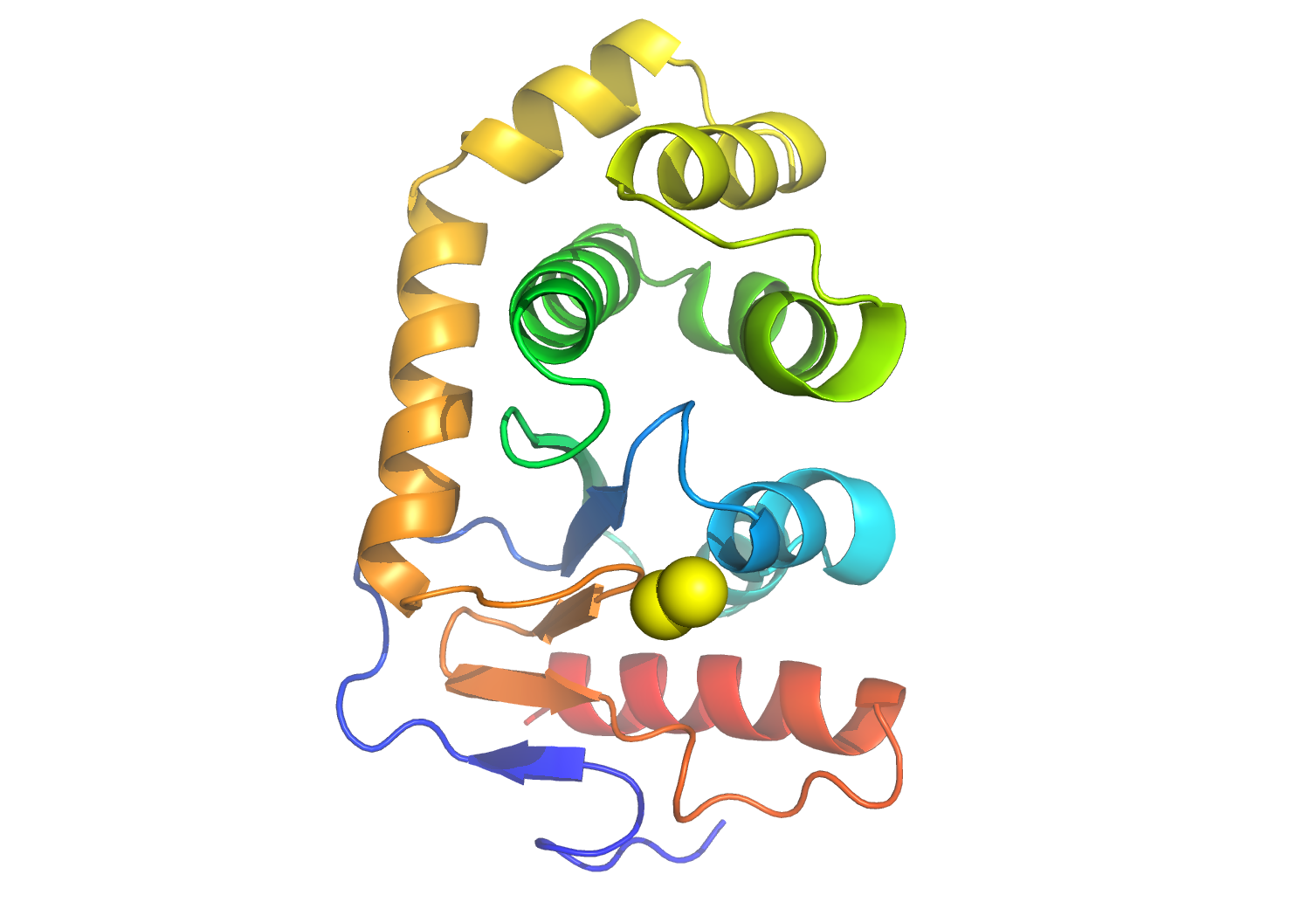
Crystal structure of DsbA – yellow spheres show the active site disulfide in the protein

Martin has continued working on DSB proteins and with collaborators developed the first inhibitors of these bacterial proteins as a potential means of combatting antibiotic resistance. She also initiated work on other proteins including phenylethanolamine N-methyl transferase (PNMT), an enzyme that catalyses adrenaline synthesis. Martin published the structure of this enzyme and later, as part of her ongoing research into different PNMT substrate-bound complexes, she and her team became the first remote access user of the Australian Synchrotron. Martin and her team have also contributed significantly to the structural biology of membrane fusion, a fundamentally important process that underpins systems as diverse as neurotransmission and blood glucose control. She wrote an invited commentary for The Conversation in 2013 on this topic, and was invited to present a keynote lecture on her membrane fusion research at the 23rd triennial International Union of Crystallography Congress held in Montreal in 2014. From 2019 to 2022, Martin was Deputy Vice-Chancellor (Research and Innovation) of the University of Wollongong.

== Recognition and awards ==
In addition to the research fellowships awarded during her career, Martin has received many honours in recognition of her professional contributions including:

- 2005 Roche Medal, Australian Society for Biochemistry and Molecular Biology
- 2005 Queensland Government Smart Women Smart State Award (Research Scientist Category)
- 2006 Women in Biotech Outstanding Biotechnology Researcher Award
- 2007 Dorothy Hodgkin Memorial Lecture, Oxford
- 2007 Honorary Life Membership, Questacon (National Science and Technology Centre), Canberra
- 2010 Lady Masson Lecture, The University of Melbourne
- 2011 Women in Technology Outstanding Biotechnology Achievement
- 2017, Wunderly Oration and Medal, Thoracic Society of Australia and New Zealand
- 2017, Elected Fellow of the Australian Academy of Science
- 2017, Elected Chartered Fellow of the Royal Australian Chemical Institute
- 2017, Inducted Bragg Member, Royal Institution of Australia
- 2018, Appointed Companion of the Order of Australia for "eminent service to science, and to scientific research, particularly in the field of biochemistry and protein crystallography applied to drug-resistant bacteria, as a role model, and as an advocate for gender equality in science".
- 2020, Leach Lecture and Medal, Lorne Protein Conference
- 2023, Ralph Slatyer Medal and Lecture, Australian National University
- 2024, Lawrence Bragg Medal, Society of Crystallographers in Australia and New Zealand
- 2026 Doctor of Laws (LLD) Honoris Causa, Monash University

Martin has held leadership roles on national and international committees. She is a former chair of the National Committee for Crystallography of the Australian Academy of Science (2008–2011), a past President of the Society for Crystallographers in Australia and New Zealand (2003–2005), former member of the Scientific Advisory Committee of the Australian Synchrotron (2002–2009, 2015–18), former President of the Asian Crystallography Association (2016–2019) and former member of the Executive Committee of the International Union of Crystallography (2017–2023). She was Chair of the worldwide Protein Data Bank Advisory Committee (2022–2024) and is currently a Trustee of the Cambridge Crystallographic Data Centre (2023–).

== Advocacy and science communication ==
Martin is a strong advocate for equal opportunity and addressing gender imbalance in academia. She published a letter in the journal Nature calling for scientific conference organisers to be more transparent with respect to their gender-balance policies and historical data and a paper describing how to achieve conference speaker gender balance. Martin also writes a blog which focuses on issues relating to women in academia. She was a Foundation member of the steering committee for Science in Australia Gender Equity (SAGE) which established the UK Athena SWAN charter in Australia to address the under-representation of women in science, particularly at senior positions in universities. As an opinion leader she has been invited to speak on gender equity worldwide, and across sectors. In 2017, she presented a keynote lecture on addressing conference gender equity at the Australia and New Zealand College of Anaesthetists Annual Scientific Meeting, and presented the Wunderly oration at the Thoracic Society Australia and New Zealand and Society of Respiratory Science Annual Scientific Meeting. In 2018 she gave the invited Inaugural Ruth Gall Memorial Lecture for the School of Chemistry at the University of Sydney on International Women's Day and the Chuwen Keynote Address at the 5th national meeting of the Australian Academy of Science EMCR Forum Science Pathways "Diversify your Thinking". Martin was the first chair of the International Union of Crystallography Gender Equity and Diversity Committee (2018–2023).

Martin is a passionate science communicator. She has participated in events such as BrisScience, which runs public lectures on science and technology; SCOM BOMB, a Google hangout operated by the Australian Science Communicators, Science Rewired and the Centre for the Public Awareness of Science as part of the No Funny Business science communication website; and the 2014 UNESCO International Year of Crystallography, including a radio interview and public lecture. In 2023, she gave the IUCr Plenary Public Lecture entitled "How I fell in love with crystallography and why you should too". She also writes articles for The Conversation, an independent, online source of news and views from the academic and research community. In 2019, she released a children's book "My aunt is a protein crystal scientist. That's Rad!".

== Personal life ==
Martin grew up in a family of nine children in Victoria. She currently resides in Brisbane with her husband Michael, and their two cats George Michael and Leo Sayer.
