= DsbA =

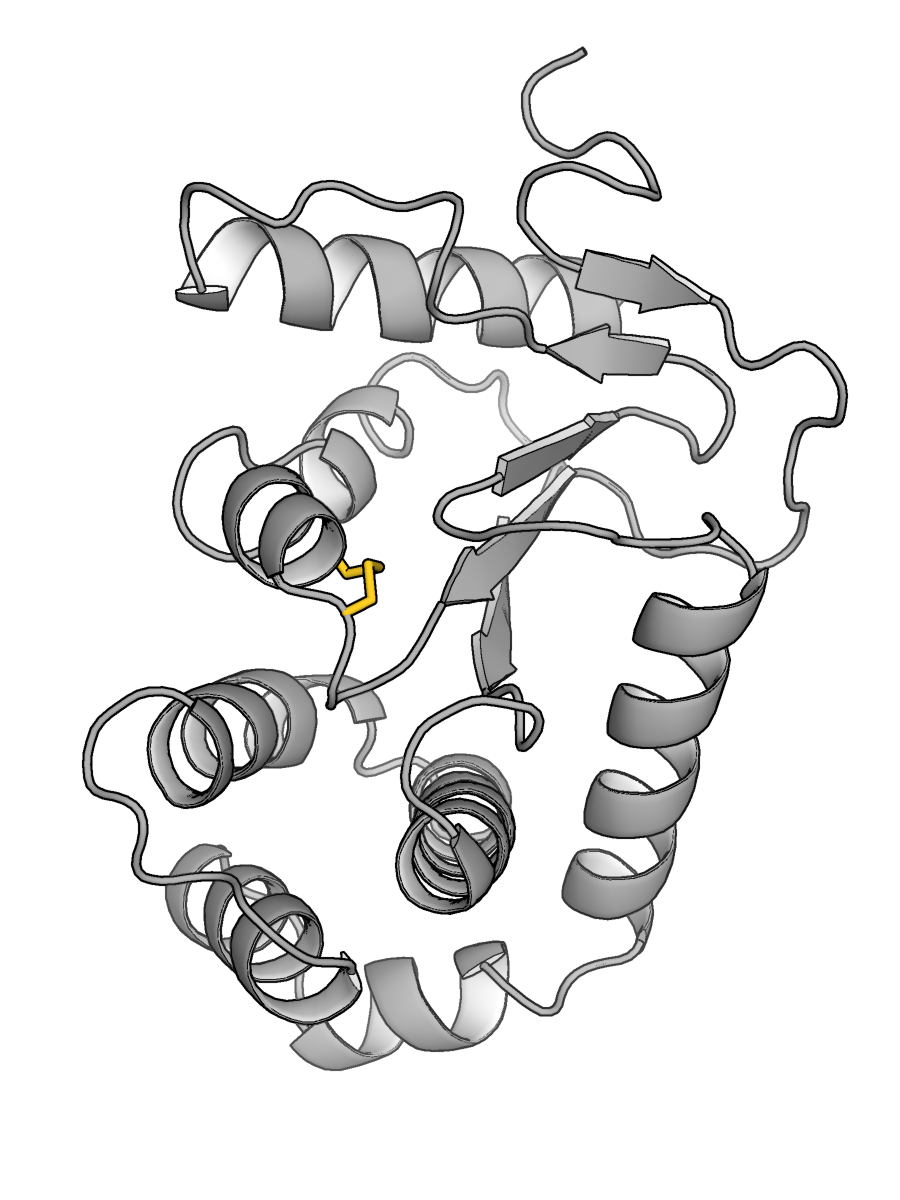
- Crystal structure of E. coli DsbA.

Identifiers
- Symbol: DsbA
- NCBI gene: 948353
- PDB: 1A2M
- UniProt: P0AEG4
Search for
- Structures: Swiss-model
- Domains: InterPro

DSBA oxidoreductase

Identifiers
- Symbol: DSBA
- Pfam: PF01323
- InterPro: IPR001853
Available protein structures:
- PDB: PDB: 1a2l PDB: 1a2m PDB: 1ac1 PDB: 1acv PDB: 1bed PDB: 1bq7 PDB: 1dsb PDB: 1fvj PDB: 1fvk PDB: 1r4w IPR001853 PF01323 (ECOD; PDBsum)
- AlphaFold: IPR001853; PF01323

DsbA is a bacterial thiol disulfide oxidoreductase (TDOR). DsbA is a key component of the Dsb (disulfide bond) family of enzymes. DsbA catalyzes intrachain disulfide bond formation as peptides emerge into the cell's periplasm.

Structurally, DsbA contains a thioredoxin domain with an inserted helical domain of unknown function. Like other thioredoxin-based enzymes, DsbA's catalytic site is a CXXC motif (CPHC in E. coli DsbA). The pair of cysteines may be oxidized (forming an internal disulfide bridge) or reduced (as free thiols), and thus allows for oxidoreductase activity by serving as an electron pair donor or acceptor, depending on oxidation state. This reaction generally proceeds through a mixed-disulfide intermediate, in which a cysteine from the enzyme forms a bond to a cysteine on the substrate. DsbA is responsible for introducing disulfide bonds into nascent proteins. In equivalent terms, it catalyzes the oxidation of a pair of cysteine residues on the substrate protein. Most of the substrates for DsbA are eventually secreted, and include important toxins, virulence factors, adhesion machinery, and motility structures DsbA is localized in the periplasm, and is more common in Gram-negative bacteria than in Gram-positive bacteria. Within the thioredoxin family, DsbA is the most strongly oxidizing member. Using glutathione oxidation as a metric, DsbA is ten times more oxidizing than protein disulfide-isomerase (the eukaryotic equivalent of DsbA). The extremely oxidizing nature of DsbA is due to an increase in stability upon reduction of DsbA, thereby imparting a decrease in energy of the enzyme when it oxidizes substrate. This feature is incredibly rare among proteins, as nearly all proteins are stabilized by the formation of disulfide bonds. DsbA's highly oxidizing nature is a result of hydrogen bond, electrostatic and helix-dipole interactions that favour the thiolate over the disulfide at the active site.

After donating its disulfide bond, DsbA is regenerated by the membrane-bound protein DsbB.

== See also ==
- Disulfide bond formation protein B
- Disulfide bond formation protein C
