= Antivirulence =

Antivirulence is the concept of blocking virulence factors. In regards to bacteria, the idea is to design agents that block virulence rather than kill bacteria en masse, as the current regime results in much more selective pressure (on antibiotic resistance).

From the early 1950s onwards, a large number of antibiotics, due to the emergence of multidrug-resistant common pathogen strains (both gram-negative and gram-positive), became scarcely effective and not-useful. This scenario has stimulated the research for an alternative strategy focused on agents (antivirulence or antipathogenic agents) aimed to disarm microorganisms cause of infectious disease, without killing or inhibiting the growth of microorganisms themselves and therefore with limited selective pressure to promote the antibiotic resistance phenomenon. The antivirulence strategy needs the knowledge of the pathogenic mechanisms and of the virulence factors that underlie them. Virulence factors are the weapons possessed by pathogens to cause damage to the host, hence they are molecules or bacterial cell structures involved in the various stages of pathogenesis such as adhesion, invasion and colonization and also in the ability to escape host defenses and to injury the host tissues by producing toxic molecules (bacterial endotoxins and exotoxins).

== Adhesion ==
The bacterial adhesion to the host tissues, involving a direct and a specific interaction between bacterial surface molecules and host ligands, is a fundamental step for microbial colonization and infection of both Gram-positive and Gram-negative pathogens. Interfere with adhesion, the first step of pathogenesis, could be an efficient way to prevent or treat infections. Gram-positive and Gram-negative pathogens adhere to the host tissues through filamentous organelles known as pili. The pili function on initial bacterial adhesion, invasion and biofilm formation, has been mainly studied for Gram-negative bacteria. There are some works on the synthesis of pilicides, chemical agents synthesized to target the chaperone–subunit interaction and the chaperone interaction with a protein involved in the biogenesis of the pili in Gram-negative known as fimbrial usher protein. Uropathogenic Escherichia coli (UPEC) is the major aetiological agent of Urinary Tract Infections (UTIs) and is often studied as a model of Gram-negative pathogen for the development of pilicides compounds. Similar structural motifs of pilin components has been found in an important family of Gram-positive surface proteins linked to peptidoglycan, the Microbial Surface Components Recognizing Adhesive Matrix Molecules (MSCRAMMs), able to recognize extracellular matrix proteins of host, such as fibrinogen, fibronectin, and collagen. If we consider the important part played by MSCRAMMs in the first step of Gram-positive pathogenesis and of biofilm formation, new antivirulence agents could be developed by using as a target the enzyme responsible of linking such proteins to cell wall, that is the Sortase A (SrtA), rather than any single surface protein involved in the mechanism of virulence. The SrtA is a membrane-bound cysteine transpeptidase that is responsible, in Gram-positive bacteria, for the covalent anchoring of surface proteins to bacterial cell wall. 3,6-Disubstituted triazolo-thiadiazole compounds are under preclinical evaluation (including animal models) as antivirulence drugs against Staphylococcus aureus. Other cell surface molecules in Gram-positive bacteria, involved in the adhesion process, without cell wall anchorage, are non proteinaceous adhesins like Wall Teichoic acids (WTAs) and lipoteichoic acids. Since WTAs are required for host infection and play important role in biofilm formation, it has been suggested that they are important virulence factors required for the establishment and spread of infection in a host. Therefore, the enzymes involved in WTAs biosynthesis can be considered as good targets for novel antivirulence agents that interfere with Gram-positive pathogenic process. One possible target is the WTA biosynthetic pathway because strains of S.aureus and Bacillus subtilis mutants in WTAs are not able to colonize the host tissue and show a greatly diminished ability to establish infection in animal models.

== Approved antivirulence drugs ==
Early examples of the antivirulence approach include mainly the inactivation of bacterial toxins with anti-toxin antibodies administered to post-exposure patients (serological therapy that induces artificially acquired passive immunization). Since inactivation of toxin during infection has proven to be an effective way to prevent or alleviate the symptoms of acute disease, significant progress has been made in the development of novel anti-toxic monoclonal antibodies. Therefore, in October 2016 the US Food and Drug Administration (FDA) and in July 2018 the Italian Drug Agency (AIFA) approved the therapeutic use of a monoclonal antibody called bezlotoxumab (Zinplava) as a treatment aimed at reducing the recurrence of Clostridioides difficile infection in patients at high risk of recurrence.
