= Janos Hajdu (biophysicist) =

Swedish biophysicist (born 1948)

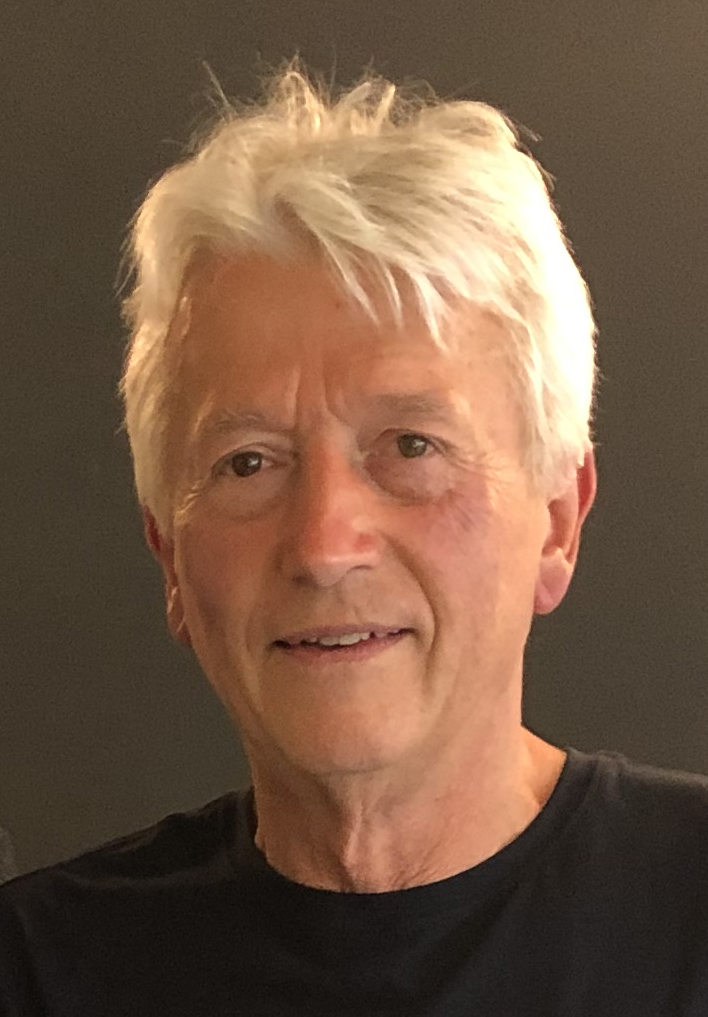
- Born: Hajdu János Gergely Menyhért; 17 September 1948; Budapest, Hungary
- Education: Eötvös József Gimnázium; Eötvös Loránd University (Diploma in Chemistry); Hungarian Academy of Sciences
- Known for: Time resolved crystallography; Coherent diffraction imaging; "Diffraction before destruction".
- Scientific career
- Fields: Biophysics; Structural biology; X-ray lasers
- Workplaces: University of Oxford; Uppsala University; Stanford University; SLAC National Accelerator Laboratory; The Linac Coherent Light Source; European XFEL; European Extreme Light Infrastructure; Hungarian Academy of Sciences
- Doctoral advisor: Péter Friedrich
- Other academic advisors: Louise Johnson; David Chilton Phillips; Brunó Ferenc Straub; Csányi Vilmos
- Notable students: Pamela A. Williams; Filipe R.N.C. Maia; Tove Sjögren; Tomas Ekeberg
- Website: https://lmb.icm.uu.se https://www.eli-beams.eu/?s=elibio

Janos Hajdu (born 17 September 1948) is a Swedish-Hungarian scientist, who has made contributions to biochemistry, biophysics, and the science of X-ray free-electron lasers. He is a professor of molecular biophysics at Uppsala University and a leading scientist at the European Extreme Light Infrastructure ERIC in Prague.

== Education ==
Hajdu matriculated in 1967 from Eötvös József Gimnasium, a grammar school in Budapest. At the age of 16, he won a science prize, which allowed him to study and perform experiments in the Institute of Medical Chemistry of the Semmelweis University Medical School in Budapest (head: Brunó Ferenc Straub). His first publication was produced in this institute. In 1968, he was admitted to Eötvös Loránd University where he received an M.Sc. in chemistry (1973). He obtained a Ph.D. in biology in 1980, "Symmetry and Structural Changes in Oligomeric Proteins" and a D.Sc. in physics in 1993, "Macromolecular Structure, Function and Dynamics: X-Ray Diffraction Studies in Four Dimensions". He left Hungary in 1981.

== Appointments ==
- 2003–present: Professor of Molecular Biophysics, Uppsala University, Sweden.
- 1995–2003: Professor of Biochemistry, Department of Biochemistry, Uppsala University, Sweden.
- 2007–2008: Professor of Photon Science, Stanford University, USA.
- 2016–present: Lead scientist at the European Extreme Light Infrastructure, Dolní Břežany, Czech Republic
- 2011–2016: Adviser to the Directors of the European XFEL GmbH, Hamburg, Germany.
- 1988–1996: Head of an MRC Laboratory at the Laboratory of Molecular Biophysics, Oxford, UK.
- 1988–1996: Lecturer in biochemistry/biophysics, Christ Church, Oxford University, U.K.
- 1983–1988: MRC/SERC Fellow at the Laboratory of Molecular Biophysics, Oxford Univ., U.K.
- 1981–1983: EMBO Fellow at the Laboratory of Molecular Biophysics, Oxford Univ., U.K.
- 1976: Roche fellow, Institute of Medical Chemistry, University of Bern, Switzerland.
- 1973–2003: Research Fellow, Institute of Enzymology, Hungarian Academy of Sciences, Budapest.

== Career and research ==
Hajdu's first employment (1973) was with the Institute of Enzymology of the Hungarian Academy of Sciences (head: Brunó Ferenc Straub). In his early work, Hajdu exploited chemistry to determine the symmetry of multi-subunit protein complexes, and characterised structural transitions in these systems. Following an invitation by Louise Johnson Hajdu joined Johnson's crystallography team in Oxford in 1981, and spent 16 years in the Laboratory of Molecular Biophysics in Oxford (1981–1996), He was first a postdoctoral research fellow and later the head of an MRC laboratory at the Laboratory of Molecular Biophysics. in 1988, he was elected a lecturer of Christ Church, Oxford, teaching biochemistry and biophysics.

In 1981, the first dedicated Synchrotron Radiation Source came to life in Daresbury, and Hajdu and his colleagues were among the first users of the facility. The new synchrotron gave them the means to pursue a new direction in structural biology which was to not only determine the structure of proteins, but to observe them functioning. The very first time-resolved X-ray diffraction experiments produced 3D movies of catalysis in crystalline enzymes and revealed structural transitions in viruses. This was a path to understand the workings of molecular machineries, but radiation damage to the sample during exposure was a serious limitation. Hajdu realised there may be a way to outrun radiation damage processes by using extremely short and intense X-ray pulses (speed of light vs. the speed of the shock wave of damage formation). Experimental tests had to wait until the arrival of the first X-ray free-electron lasers, delivering femtosecond X-ray pulses with a peak brightness exceeding synchrotrons by a factor of ten billion. Funding for building such X-ray free-electron lasers faced hurdles.

The turning point occurred in 1996, when Hajdu took up a chair at Uppsala University and set up a European research network to explore the physical limits of imaging. The project engaged an interdisciplinary approach, drawing upon structural sciences, plasma physics, optics and mathematics. Hajdu presented their findings to the US Department of Energy in 2000 as part of the scientific justification for building the first hard X-ray free-electron laser, the Linac Coherent Light Source (LCLS), at Stanford.

The proof of principle experiment was performed In 2006 with a soft X-ray free-electron laser in Hamburg where Hajdu with Henry N. Chapman and colleagues demonstrated experimentally that outrunning radiation damage is possible with a femtosecond X-ray pulse. The pulse turned the nano-patterned sample into a 60,000 K plasma, but not before a diffraction pattern of the virtually undamaged object could be recorded. The object was reconstructed to the diffraction-limited resolution. When the first hard X-ray free-electron laser (LCLS) was turned on in 2009, they also showed that "diffraction before destruction" or "observation before destruction" extends to the atomic scale launching the methods of serial nano-crystallography, ultrafast diffractive imaging, flash radiography, spectroscopy, and applications in fusion energy research

== Achievements ==
- X-ray crystallography in four dimensions: First atomic movies on chemical reactions.
- Development of Laue crystallography: First structural results for proteins and viruses.
- Proposal for a link between late steps in protein folding and structural changes in protein function.
- Discovery of X-ray driven catalysis in redox enzymes.
- Structures for the family of mononuclear ferrous enzymes.
- "Diffraction before destruction", the physical limits of imaging.
- The scientific case (in imaging) that assured funding for the first hard X-ray free-electron lasers in the US (the LCLS at Stanford)

and in Europe (the European XFEL, Hamburg).

- Scientific justification for building the European Extreme Light Infrastructure.
- Development of X-ray free-electron laser based structural sciences.

== Honours ==
- 2001: Member of the Kungliga Vetenskap-Societeten i Uppsala (The Swedish Royal Society).
- 2013: Honorary Member, Hungarian Academy of Sciences (2013).

== Awards ==
- 2025: The Bror Holmberg Prize, awarded by the Swedish Chemical Society "for outstanding contributions to chemical research".
- 2022: The Gregori Aminoff Prize (2022) for "fundamental contributions to the development of X-ray free-electron laser based structural biology" and "explosive studies of biological macromolecules" together with Henry N. Chapman and John C. H. Spence.
- 2015: Fabinyi Rudolf Medal "for outstanding contribution to chemistry".
- 2012: Rudbeck Medal (2012) "for extraordinarily prominent achievements in science, to be conferred primarily for such accomplishments or findings attained at Uppsala University".
- 2011–2016: ERC Advanced Investigator Award "X-Ray Lasers, Photon Science, and Structural Biology" (XLASERS) ERC 291602.
- 2011–2016: Knut and Alice Wallenberg Award "Photon Science and X-Ray Lasers (BRIGHT-LIGHT)" KAW 2011.0081.
- 2005: Centre of Excellence Award, Swedish Research Council.
- 2001: Excellent Research Environment Award, Swedish Research Council.

Hajdu is Main Editor of the Journal of Applied Crystallography and Editorial Board Member of Nature's Scientific Data.

== See also ==
- Henry Chapman
