= Disulfide bond formation protein B =

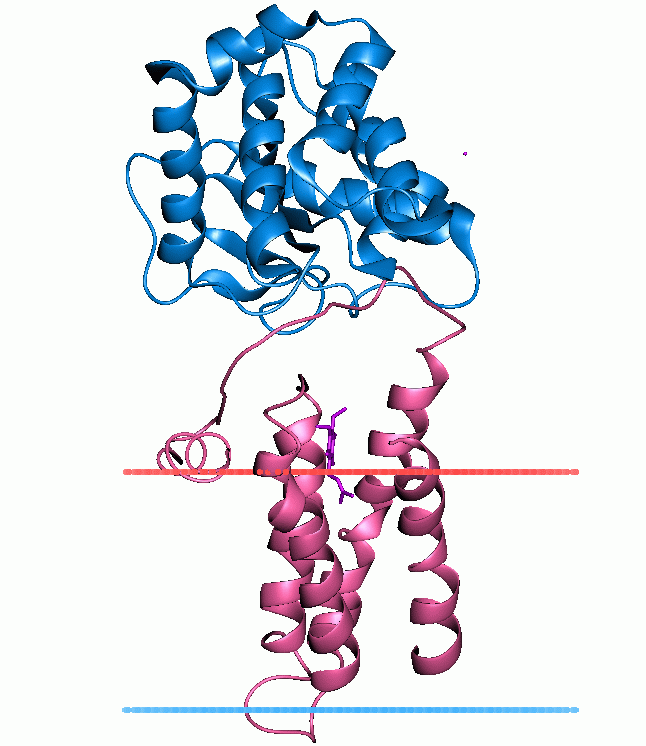
- Disulfide bond formation protein B (red), complex with DsbA (blue)

Identifiers
- Symbol: DsbB
- Pfam: PF02600
- InterPro: IPR003752
- TCDB: 5.A.2
- OPM superfamily: 173
- OPM protein: 2hi7
Available protein structures:
- PDB: IPR003752 PF02600 (ECOD; PDBsum)
- AlphaFold: IPR003752; PF02600

Disulfide bond formation protein B (DsbB) is a protein component of the pathway that leads to disulfide bond formation in periplasmic proteins of Escherichia coli (P0A6M2) and other bacteria. In Bacillus subtilis it is known as BdbC (O32217).

The DsbB protein oxidizes the periplasmic protein DsbA which in turn oxidizes cysteines in other periplasmic proteins in order to make disulfide bonds. DsbB acts as a redox potential transducer across the cytoplasmic membrane. It is a membrane protein which spans the membrane four times with both the N- and C-termini of the protein are in the cytoplasm. Each of the periplasmic domains of the protein has two essential cysteines. The two cysteines in the first periplasmic domain are in a Cys-X-Y-Cys configuration that is characteristic of the active site of other proteins involved in disulfide bond formation, including DsbA and protein disulfide isomerase.

== See also ==
- Disulfide bond formation protein A
- Disulfide bond formation protein C
