= DanceSport BC =

Governing body of ballroom dancing in British Columbia

DanceSport BC (DSBC), founded in 1968, is the governing body for competitive ballroom dance in British Columbia and Yukon, Canada. It is a member of the Canadian Amateur DanceSport Association.

DSBC is a non-profit, volunteer-run organization that promotes ballroom dancing in British Columbia. Among its numerous functions, it publishes a newsletter, Dancin', every two months and a dancers' guide, Steppin' Out, each year.

DanceSport BC sanctions several annual competitions, including:

- SnowBall Classic – Vancouver (IDSF world-ranking competition) (February). Hosted by DanceSport BC.
- UBC Gala Ball – Vancouver (March). Hosted by the University of British Columbia Dance Club.
- Island Fantasy Ball (including the BC Closed Championships) – Nanaimo (May). Hosted by the Nanaimo Ballroom Dance Society.
- Dance Pacifica – Victoria (June). Hosted by the Victoria Ballroom Dance Society.
- Pro-Am Fiesta – Richmond (June). Hosted by the Grand Ballroom.
- Okanagan DanceSport Festival – Penticton (July).
- Crystal Invitational DanceSport Festival – Vancouver (September or October). Hosted by the Crystal Ballroom.
- The Grand Ball – Richmond (November). Hosted by the Grand Ballroom.
