= Host–pathogen interaction =

Biological interrelationship

The host–pathogen interaction is defined as how microbes or viruses sustain themselves within host organisms on a molecular, cellular, organismal or population level. This term is most commonly used to refer to disease-causing microorganisms although they may not cause illness in all hosts. Because of this, the definition has been expanded to how known pathogens survive within their host, whether they cause disease or not.

On the molecular and cellular level, microbes can infect the host and divide rapidly, causing disease by being there and causing a homeostatic imbalance in the body, or by secreting toxins which cause symptoms to appear. Viruses can also infect the host with virulent DNA, which can affect normal cell processes (transcription, translation, etc.), protein folding, or evading the immune response.

== Pathogenicity ==
=== Pathogen history ===
One of the first pathogens observed by scientists was Vibrio cholerae, described in detail by Filippo Pacini in 1854. His initial findings were just drawings of the bacteria but, up until 1880, he published many other papers concerning the bacteria. He described how it causes diarrhea as well as developed effective treatments against it. Most of these findings went unnoticed until Robert Koch rediscovered the organism in 1884 and linked it to the disease.

Giardia lamblia was discovered by Leeuwenhoeck in the 1600s but was not found to be pathogenic until the 1970s, when an EPA-sponsored symposium was held following a large outbreak in Oregon involving the parasite. Since then, many other organisms have been identified as pathogens, such as H. pylori and E. coli, which have allowed scientists to develop antibiotics to combat these harmful microorganisms.

=== Types of pathogens ===
Pathogens include bacteria, fungi, protozoa, parasitic worms (helminths), and viruses.

Each of these different types of organisms can then be further classified as a pathogen based on its mode of transmission. This includes the following: food borne, airborne, waterborne, blood-borne, and vector-borne. Many pathogenic bacteria, such as food-borne Staphylococcus aureus and Clostridium botulinum, secrete toxins into the host to cause symptoms. HIV and hepatitis B are viral infections caused by blood-borne pathogens. Aspergillus the most common pathogenic fungi, secretes aflatoxin, which acts as a carcinogen and contaminates many foods, especially those grown underground (nuts, potatoes, etc.).

=== Transmission methods ===
Within the host, pathogens can do a variety of things to cause disease and trigger the immune response.

Microbes and fungi cause symptoms due to their high rate of reproduction and tissue invasion. This causes an immune response, resulting in common symptoms as phagocytes break down the bacteria within the host.

Some bacteria, such as H. pylori, can secrete toxins into the surrounding tissues, resulting in cell death or inhibition of normal tissue function.

Viruses, however, use a completely different mechanism to cause disease. Upon entry into the host, they can do one of two things. Many times, viral pathogens enter the lytic cycle; this is when the virus inserts its DNA or RNA into the host cell, replicates, and eventually causes the cell to lyse, releasing more viruses into the environment. The lysogenic cycle, however, is when the viral DNA is incorporated into the host genome, allowing it to go unnoticed by the immune system. Eventually, it gets reactivated and enters the lytic cycle, giving it an indefinite "shelf life" so to speak. Non-lyctic viruses may also be vertically transmitted after undergoing endogenization, although this occurs incidentally and the result is often non-pathogenic.

== Context-based host interactions ==
=== Types of interactions ===
There are three types of host–pathogen interactions based on how the pathogen interacts with the host. Commensalism is when the pathogen benefits while the host gains nothing from the interaction. An example of this is Bacteroides thetaiotaomicron, which resides in the human intestinal tract but provides no known benefits. Mutualism occurs when both the pathogen and the host benefit from the interaction, as seen in the human stomach. Many of the bacteria aid in breaking down nutrients for the host, and in return, our bodies act as their ecosystem. Parasitism occurs when the pathogen benefits from the relationship while the host is harmed. This can be seen in the unicellular Plasmodium falciparum parasite which causes malaria in humans.

=== Pathogenic variability in hosts ===
Although pathogens do have the capability to cause disease, they do not always do so. This is described as context-dependent pathogenicity. Scientists believe that this variability comes from both genetic and environmental factors within the host. One example of this in humans is E. coli. Normally, this bacteria flourishes as a part of the normal, healthy microbiota in the intestines. However, if it relocates to a different region of the digestive tract or the body, it can cause intense diarrhea. So, while E. coli is classified as a pathogen, but it does not always act as such. This example can also be applied to S. aureus and other common microbial flora in humans.

== Current pathogenic treatment methods ==
Currently, antimicrobials are the primary treatment method for pathogens. These drugs are specifically designed to kill microbes or inhibit further growth within the host environment. Multiple terms can be used to describe antimicrobial drugs. Antibiotics are chemicals made by microbes that can be used against other pathogens, such as penicillin and erythromycin. Semi-synthetics are antimicrobials that are derived from bacteria, but they are enhanced to have a greater effect. In contrast to both of these, synthetic are strictly made in the lab to combat pathogenicity. Each of these three types of antimicrobials can be classified into two subsequent groups: bactericidal and bacteriostatic. Bactericidal substances kill microorganisms while bacteriostatic substances inhibit microbial growth.

The main problem with pathogenic drug treatments in the modern world is drug resistance. Many patients don't take the full treatment of drugs, leading to the natural selection of resistant bacteria. One example of this is methicillin-resistant Staphylococcus aureus (MRSA). Because of antibiotic overuse, only the bacteria which have developed genetic mutations to combat the drug can survive. This reduces drug effectiveness and renders many treatments useless.

== Future directions ==
Thanks to network analysis of host–pathogen interactions and large-scale analyses of RNA sequencing data from infected host cells, we know that pathogen proteins causing an extensive rewiring of the host interactome have a higher impact in pathogen fitness during infection. These observations suggest that hubs in the host–pathogen interactome should be explored as promising targets for antimicrobial drug design. Dual-species proteomics could also be employed to study host–pathogen interactions by simultaneously quantifying proteins newly synthesized by the host and pathogen. Currently, many scientists are aiming to understand genetic variability and how it contributes to pathogen interaction and variability within the host. They are also aiming to limit the transmission methods for many pathogens to prevent rapid spread in hosts. As we learn more about the host–pathogen interaction and the amount of variability within hosts, the definition of the interaction needs to be redefined. Casadevall proposes that pathogenicity should be determined based on the amount of damage caused to the host, classifying pathogens into different categories based on how they function in the host. However, in order to cope with the changing pathogenic environment, treatment methods need to be revised to deal with drug-resistant microbes.

== See also ==
- Phytobiome
