= Periplasm =

Region between the inner and outer membrane

The periplasm is a concentrated gel-like matrix in the space between the inner cytoplasmic membrane and the bacterial outer membrane called the periplasmic space in Gram-negative (more accurately "diderm") bacteria. Using cryo-electron microscopy it has been found that a much smaller periplasmic space is also present in Gram-positive bacteria (more accurately "monoderm"), between cell wall and the plasma membrane. The periplasm may constitute up to 40% of the total cell volume of gram-negative bacteria, but is a much smaller percentage in gram-positive bacteria.

== Terminology ==
Although bacteria are conventionally divided into two main groups—Gram-positive and Gram-negative, based upon their Gram-stain retention property—this classification system is ambiguous as it can refer to three distinct aspects (staining result, cell-envelope organization, taxonomic group), which do not necessarily coalesce for some bacterial species. In most situations such as in this article, Gram-staining reflects the marked differences in the ultrastructure and chemical composition of the two main kinds of bacteria. The usual "Gram-positive" type does not have an outer lipid membrane, while the typical "Gram-negative" bacterium does. The terms "diderm" and "monoderm", coined to refer to this distinction only, is a more reliable and fundamental characteristic of the bacterial cells.

Monoderm bacteria have a thin periplasm between the cell wall and the plasma membrane

All Gram-positive bacteria are bounded by a single unit lipid membrane (i.e. monoderm); they generally contain a thick layer (20-80 nm) of peptidoglycan responsible for retaining the Gram-stain. A number of other bacteria which are bounded by a single membrane but stain gram-negative due to either lack of the peptidoglycan layer (viz., mycoplasmas) or their inability to retain the Gram-stain due to their cell wall composition, also show close relationship to the Gram-positive bacteria. For the bacterial (prokaryotic) cells that are bounded by a single cell membrane the term "monoderm bacteria" or "monoderm prokaryotes" has been proposed. In contrast to gram-positive bacteria, all archetypical Gram-negative bacteria are bounded by a cytoplasmic membrane as well as an outer cell membrane; they contain only a thin layer of peptidoglycan (2–3 nm) between these membranes. The presence of both inner and outer cell membranes forms and define the periplasmic space or periplasmic compartment. These bacterial cells with two membranes have been designated as diderm bacteria. The distinction between the monoderm and diderm prokaryotes is supported by conserved signature indels in a number of important proteins (for example, DnaK and GroEL).

== Structure ==
Gram-negative (diderm) cell wall

As shown in the figure to the right, the periplasmic space in gram-negative or diderm bacteria is located between the inner and outer membrane of the cell. The periplasm contains peptidoglycan and the membranes that enclose the periplasmic space contain many integral membrane proteins, which can participate in cell signaling. Furthermore, the periplasm houses motility organelles such as the flagellum, which spans both membranes enclosing the periplasm. The periplasm is described as gel-like due to the high abundance of proteins and peptidoglycan. The periplasm occupies 7% to 40% of the total volume of diderm bacteria, and contains up to 30% of cellular proteins. The structure of the monoderm periplasm differs from that of diderm bacteria as the so-called periplasmic space in monoderm bacteria is not enclosed by two membranes but is rather enclosed by the cytoplasmic membrane and the peptidoglycan layer beneath. For this reason, the monoderm periplasmic space is also referred to as the inner-wall zone (IWZ). The IWZ serves as the first destination of translocation for proteins being transported across the monoderm bacterial cell wall.

== Function ==
In diderm bacteria, the periplasm contains a thin cell wall composed of peptidoglycan. In addition, it includes solutes such as ions and proteins, which are involved in wide variety of functions ranging from nutrient binding, transport, folding, degradation, substrate hydrolysis, to peptidoglycan synthesis, electron transport, and alteration of substances toxic to the cell (xenobiotic metabolism). Importantly, the periplasm is devoid of ATP. Several types of enzyme are present in the periplasm including alkaline phosphatases, cyclic nucleotide phosphodiesterases, acid phosphatases and 5'-nucleotidases. Of note, the periplasm also contains enzymes important for the facilitation of protein folding. For example, disulfide bond protein A (DsbA) and disulfide bond protein C (DsbC), which are responsible for catalyzing peptide bond formation and isomerization, respectively, were identified in the periplasm of E. Coli. As disulfide bond formation is frequently a rate-limiting step in the folding of proteins, these oxidizing enzymes play an important role in the bacteria periplasm. In addition, the periplasm mediates the uptake of DNA in several strains of transformable bacteria.

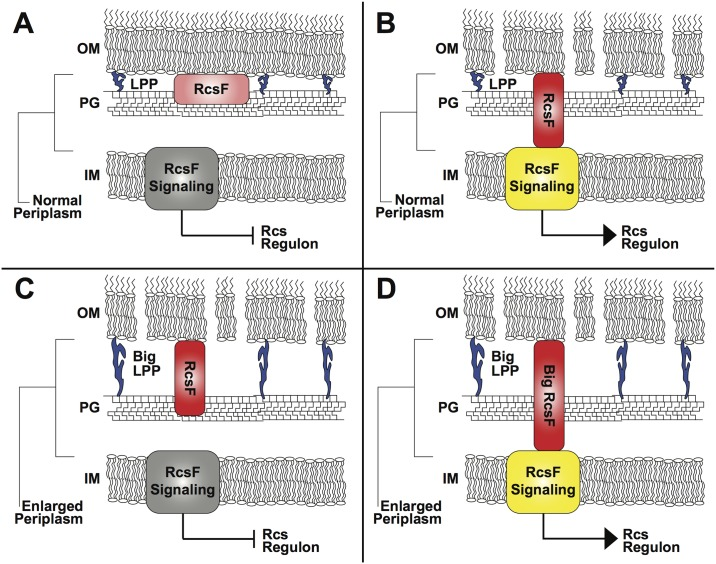
Figure demonstrating modulation of RcsF signaling by changes in the periplasmic intermembrane distance

The compartmentalization afforded by the periplasmic space gives rise to several important functions. Aside from those previously mentioned, the periplasm also functions in protein transport and quality control, analogous to the endoplasmic reticulum in eukaryotes. Furthermore, the separation of the periplasm from the cytoplasm allows for the compartmentalization of enzymes that could be toxic in the cytoplasm. Some peptidoglycans and lipoproteins located in the periplasm provide a structural support system for the cell that aids in promoting the cell's ability to withstand turgor pressure. Notably, organelles such as the flagellum require the assembly of polymers within the periplasm for proper functioning. As the driveshaft of the flagellum spans the periplasmic space, its length is dictated by positioning of the outer membrane as induced by its contraction, which is mediated by periplasmic polymers. The periplasm also functions in cell signaling, such as in the case of the lipoprotein RcsF, which has a globular domain residing in the periplasm and acts as a stress sensor. When RcsF fails to interact with BamA, such as in the case of an enlarged periplasm, RcsF is not exported to the cell surface and are able to trigger the Rcs signaling cascade. Periplasm size, therefore, plays an important role in stress signaling.

== Clinical significance ==
As bacteria are the responsible pathogen for many infections and illnesses, the biochemical and structural components that distinguish disease causing bacterial cells from native eukaryotic cells are of great interest from a clinical perspective. Gram-negative bacteria tend to be more antimicrobial resistant than gram-positive bacteria, and also possess a much more significant periplasmic space between their two membrane bilayers. Since eukaryotes do not possess a periplasmic space, structures and enzymes found in the gram-negative periplasm are attractive targets for antimicrobial drug therapies. Additionally, vital functions such as facilitation of protein folding, protein transport, cell signaling, structural integrity, and nutrient uptake are performed by periplasm components, making it rich in potential drug targets. Aside from enzymes and structural components that are vital to cell function and survival, the periplasm also contains virulence-associated proteins such as DsbA that can be targeted by antimicrobial therapies. Due to their role in catalyzing disulfide bond formation for a variety of virulence factors, the DsbA/DsbB system has been of particular interest as a target for anti-virulence drugs.

The periplasmic space is deeply interconnected with the pathogenesis of disease in the setting of microbial infection. Many of the virulence factors associated with bacterial pathogenicity are secretion proteins, which are often subject to post-translational modification including disulfide bond formation. The oxidative environment of the periplasm contains Dsb (disulfide bond formation) proteins that catalyze such post-translational modifications, and therefore play an important role in establishing virulence factor tertiary and quaternary structure essential for proper protein function. In addition to Dsb proteins found in the periplasm, motility organelles such as the flagellum are also essential for host infection. The flagellum is rooted in the periplasm and is stabilized by interaction with periplasmic structural components, and is therefore another pathogenesis-related target for antimicrobial agents. During infection of a host, the cell of a bacterium is subject to many turbulent environmental conditions, which highlights the importance of the structural integrity afforded by the periplasm. In particular, peptidoglycan synthesis is vital to cell wall production, and inhibitors of peptidoglycan synthesis have been of clinical interest for targeting bacteria for many decades. Furthermore, the periplasm is also relevant to clinical developments by way of its role in mediating the uptake of transforming DNA.
