= Cell signaling =

System of communication

In a signaling pathway, series of molecules, usually proteins, transmit messages and control processes within a cell in response to an environmental cue.

Cell signaling (cell signalling in British English) is the biological process by which a cell interacts with itself, with other cells, and with the environment. Cell signaling is a fundamental property of all forms of life. Typically, the signaling process involves three components: the first messenger (the ligand), the receptor, and the signal itself.

In biology, signals are mostly chemical in nature, but can also be physical cues such as pressure, voltage, temperature, or light. Chemical signals are molecules with the ability to bind and activate a specific receptor. These molecules, also referred to as ligands, are chemically diverse, including ions (such as Na^{+}, K^{+}, and Ca^{2+}), lipids (e.g. steroid, prostaglandin), peptides (e.g. insulin, ACTH), carbohydrates, glycosylated proteins (proteoglycans), nucleic acids, etc. Peptide and lipid ligands are particularly important, as most hormones belong to these classes of chemicals. Peptides are usually polar, hydrophilic molecules. As such they are unable to diffuse freely across the bi-lipid layer of the plasma membrane, so their action is mediated by a cell membrane bound receptor. On the other hand, liposoluble chemicals such as steroid hormones, can diffuse passively across the plasma membrane and interact with intracellular receptors.

Cell signaling can be classified as autocrine, intracrine, juxtacrine, paracrine, or endocrine. Autocrine signaling occurs when the chemical signal acts on the same cell that produced the signaling chemical. Intracrine signaling occurs when the chemical signal produced by a cell acts on receptors located in the cytoplasm or nucleus of the same cell. Juxtacrine signaling occurs between physically adjacent cells. Paracrine signaling occurs between nearby cells. Endocrine signaling occurs between distant cells, with the chemical signal (hormone) usually carried by the blood.

Receptors are complex proteins or tightly bound multimer of proteins, located in the plasma membrane or within the interior of the cell such as in the cytoplasm, organelles, and nucleus. Receptors have the ability to detect a signal either by binding to a specific chemical or by undergoing a conformational change when interacting with physical agents. It is the specificity of the chemical interaction between a given ligand and its receptor that confers the ability to trigger a specific cellular response. Receptors can be broadly classified into cell membrane receptors and intracellular receptors.

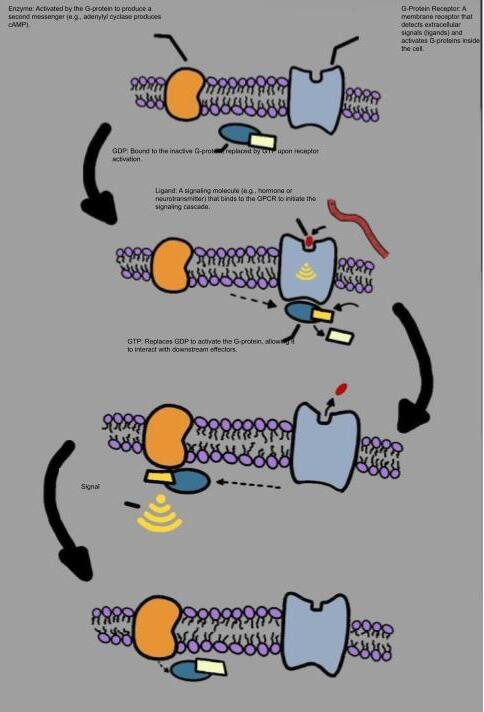
Diagram of G protein-coupled reception

Cell membrane receptors can be further classified into ion channel linked receptors, G-Protein coupled receptors and enzyme linked receptors.

- Ion channels receptors are large transmembrane proteins with a ligand activated gate function. When these receptors are activated, they may allow or block passage of specific ions across the cell membrane. Most receptors activated by physical stimuli such as pressure or temperature belongs to this category.
- G-protein receptors are multimeric proteins embedded within the plasma membrane. These receptors have extracellular, trans-membrane and intracellular domains. The extracellular domain is responsible for the interaction with a specific ligand. The intracellular domain is responsible for the initiation of a cascade of chemical reactions which ultimately triggers the specific cellular function controlled by the receptor.
- Enzyme-linked receptors are transmembrane proteins with an extracellular domain responsible for binding a specific ligand and an intracellular domain with enzymatic or catalytic activity. Upon activation the enzymatic portion is responsible for promoting specific intracellular chemical reactions.

Intracellular receptors have a different mechanism of action. They usually bind to lipid soluble ligands that diffuse passively through the plasma membrane such as steroid hormones. These ligands bind to specific cytoplasmic transporters that shuttle the hormone-transporter complex inside the nucleus where specific genes are activated and the synthesis of specific proteins is promoted.

The effector component of the signaling pathway begins with signal transduction. In this process, the signal, by interacting with the receptor, starts a series of molecular events within the cell leading to the final effect of the signaling process. Typically the final effect consists in the activation of an ion channel (ligand-gated ion channel) or the initiation of a second messenger system cascade that propagates the signal through the cell. Second messenger systems can amplify or modulate a signal, in which activation of a few receptors results in multiple secondary messengers being activated, thereby amplifying the initial signal (the first messenger). The downstream effects of these signaling pathways may include additional enzymatic activities such as proteolytic cleavage, phosphorylation, methylation, and ubiquitinylation.

Signaling molecules can be synthesized from various biosynthetic pathways and released through passive or active transports, or even from cell damage.

Each cell is programmed to respond to specific extracellular signal molecules, and is the basis of development, tissue repair, immunity, and homeostasis. Errors in signaling interactions may cause diseases such as cancer, autoimmunity, and diabetes.

== Taxonomic range ==
In many small organisms such as bacteria, quorum sensing enables individuals to begin an activity only when the population is sufficiently large. This signaling between cells was first observed in the marine bacterium Aliivibrio fischeri, which produces light when the population is dense enough. The mechanism involves the production and detection of a signaling molecule, and the regulation of gene transcription in response. Quorum sensing operates in both gram-positive and gram-negative bacteria, and both within and between species.

In slime molds, individual cells aggregate together to form fruiting bodies and eventually spores, under the influence of a chemical signal, known as an acrasin. The individuals move by chemotaxis, i.e. they are attracted by the chemical gradient. Some species use cyclic AMP as the signal; others such as Polysphondylium violaceum use a dipeptide known as glorin.

In plants and animals, signaling between cells occurs either through release into the extracellular space, divided in paracrine signaling (over short distances) and endocrine signaling (over long distances), or by direct contact, known as juxtacrine signaling such as notch signaling. Autocrine signaling is a special case of paracrine signaling where the secreting cell has the ability to respond to the secreted signaling molecule. Synaptic signaling is a special case of paracrine signaling (for chemical synapses) or juxtacrine signaling (for electrical synapses) between neurons and target cells.

== Extracellular signal ==
=== Synthesis and release ===
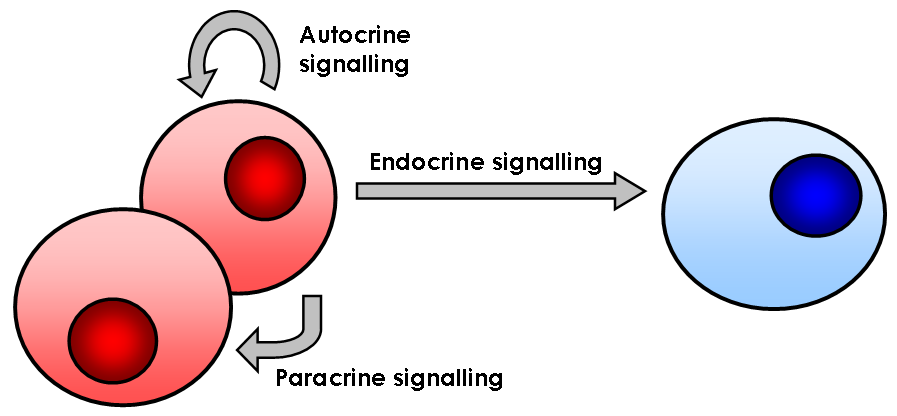
Different types of extracellular signaling

Many cell signals are carried by molecules that are released by one cell and move to make contact with another cell. Signaling molecules can belong to several chemical classes: lipids, phospholipids, amino acids, monoamines, proteins, glycoproteins, or gases. Signaling molecules binding surface receptors are generally large and hydrophilic (e.g. TRH, Vasopressin, Acetylcholine), while those entering the cell are generally small and hydrophobic (e.g. glucocorticoids, thyroid hormones, cholecalciferol, retinoic acid), but important exceptions to both are numerous, and the same molecule can act both via surface receptors or in an intracrine manner to different effects. In animal cells, specialized endocrine cells release these hormones and send them through the circulatory system to other parts of the body. They then reach target cells, which can recognize and respond to the hormones and produce a result. This is also known as endocrine signaling. Plant growth regulators, or plant hormones, move through cells or by diffusing through the air as a gas to reach their targets. Hydrogen sulfide is produced in small amounts by some cells of the human body and has a number of biological signaling functions. Only two other such gases are currently known to act as signaling molecules in the human body: nitric oxide and carbon monoxide.

==== Exocytosis ====
Exocytosis is the process by which a cell transports molecules such as neurotransmitters and proteins out of the cell. As an active transport mechanism, exocytosis requires the use of energy to transport material. Exocytosis and its counterpart, endocytosis, the process that brings substances into the cell, are used by all cells because most chemical substances important to them are large polar molecules that cannot pass through the hydrophobic portion of the cell membrane by passive transport. Exocytosis is the process by which a large amount of molecules are released; thus it is a form of bulk transport. Exocytosis occurs via secretory portals at the cell plasma membrane called porosomes. Porosomes are permanent cup-shaped lipoprotein structures at the cell plasma membrane, where secretory vesicles transiently dock and fuse to release intra-vesicular contents from the cell.

In the context of neurotransmission, neurotransmitters are typically released from synaptic vesicles into the synaptic cleft via exocytosis; however, neurotransmitters can also be released via reverse transport through membrane transport proteins.

=== Types ===
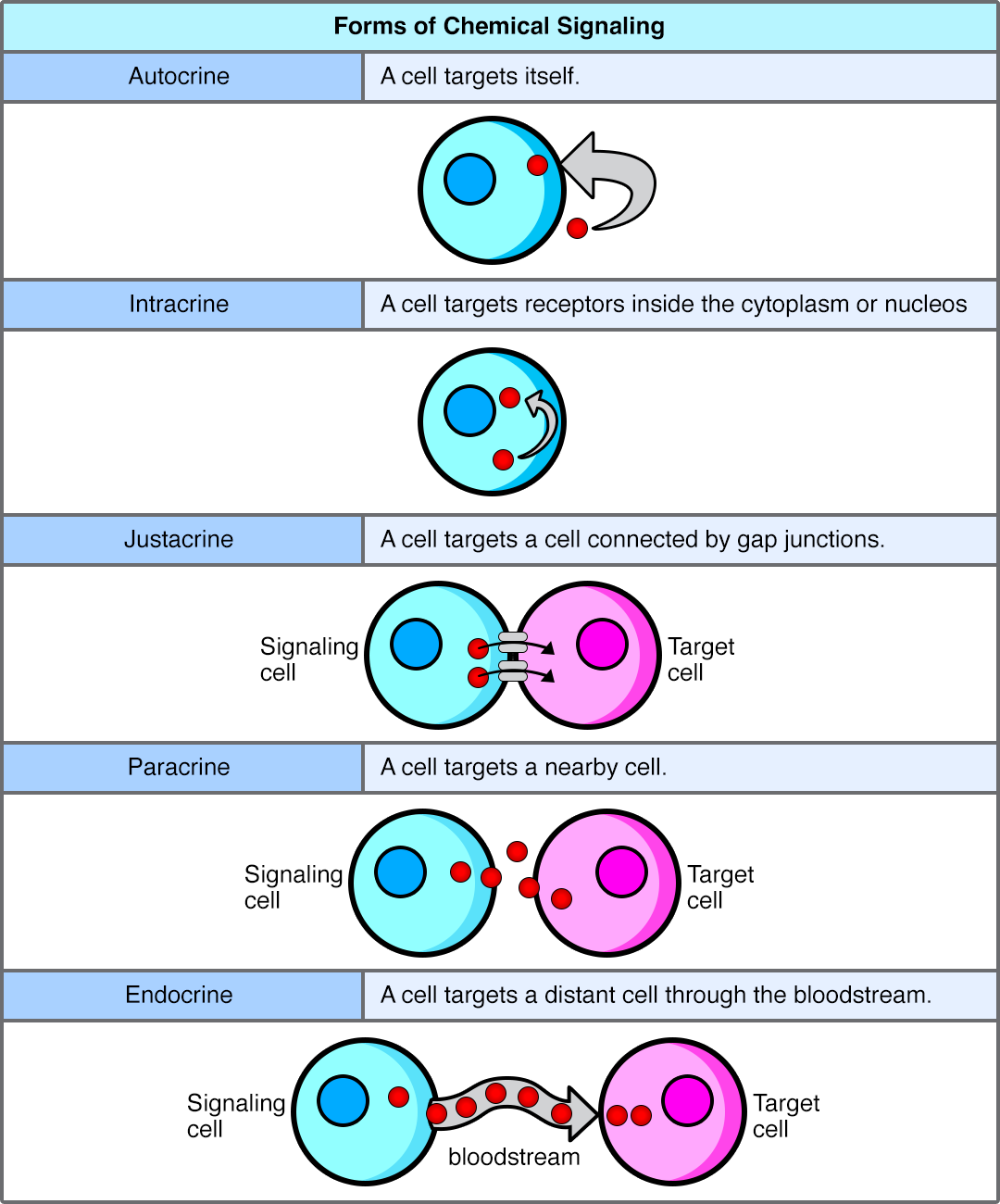
Different types of cell signaling

==== Autocrine ====
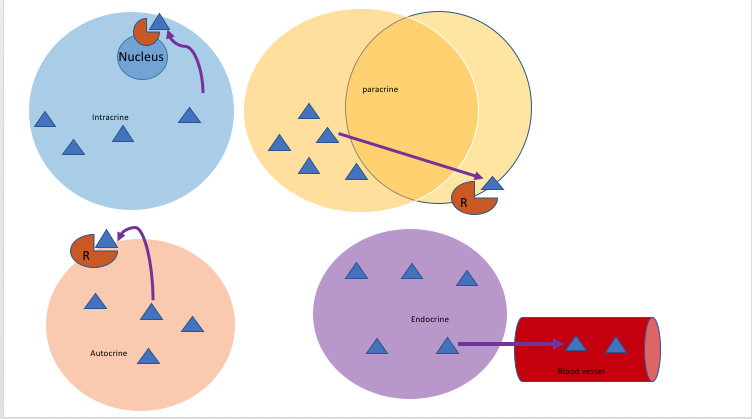
Differences between autocrine and paracrine signaling

Autocrine signaling involves a cell secreting a hormone or chemical messenger (called the autocrine agent) that binds to autocrine receptors on that same cell, leading to changes in the cell itself. This can be contrasted with paracrine signaling, intracrine signaling, or classical endocrine signaling.

==== Intracrine ====
In intracrine signaling, the signaling chemicals are produced inside the cell and bind to cytosolic or nuclear receptors within the cell. This type of signaling sets it apart from the other cell signaling mechanisms such as autocrine signaling. In both autocrine and intracrine signaling, the signal has an effect on the cell that produced it.

==== Juxtacrine ====
Juxtacrine signaling is a type of cell–cell or cell–extracellular matrix signaling in multicellular organisms that requires close contact. There are three types:

1. A membrane ligand (protein, oligosaccharide, lipid) and a membrane protein of two adjacent cells interact.
2. A communicating gap junction links the intracellular compartments of two adjacent cells, allowing transit of relatively small molecules.
3. An extracellular matrix glycoprotein and a membrane protein interact.

Additionally, in unicellular organisms such as bacteria, juxtacrine signaling means interactions by membrane contact. Juxtacrine signaling has been observed for some growth factors, cytokine and chemokine cellular signals, playing an important role in the immune response. Juxtacrine signalling via direct membrane contacts is also present between neuronal cell bodies and motile processes of microglia both during development, and in the adult brain.

==== Paracrine ====
Paracrine cell signaling is typically between two nearby cells typically between 0.02 micrometers to 500 micrometers apart.

In paracrine signaling, a cell produces a signal to induce changes in nearby cells, altering the behaviour of those cells. Signaling molecules known as paracrine factors diffuse over a relatively short distance (local action), as opposed to cell signaling by endocrine factors, hormones which travel considerably longer distances via the circulatory system; juxtacrine interactions; and autocrine signaling. Cells that produce paracrine factors secrete them into the immediate extracellular environment. Factors then travel to nearby cells in which the gradient of factor received determines the outcome. However, the exact distance that paracrine factors can travel is not certain.

Paracrine signals such as retinoic acid target only cells in the vicinity of the emitting cell. Neurotransmitters represent another example of a paracrine signal.

Some signaling molecules can function as both a hormone and a neurotransmitter. For example, epinephrine and norepinephrine can function as hormones when released from the adrenal gland and are transported to the heart by way of the blood stream. Norepinephrine can also be produced by neurons to function as a neurotransmitter within the brain. Estrogen can be released by the ovary and function as a hormone or act locally via paracrine or autocrine signaling.

Although paracrine signaling elicits a diverse array of responses in the induced cells, most paracrine factors utilize a relatively streamlined set of receptors and pathways. In fact, different organs in the body - even between different species - are known to utilize a similar sets of paracrine factors in differential development. The highly conserved receptors and pathways can be organized into four major families based on similar structures: fibroblast growth factor (FGF) family, Hedgehog family, Wnt family, and TGF-β superfamily. Binding of a paracrine factor to its respective receptor initiates signal transduction cascades, eliciting different responses.

==== Endocrine ====
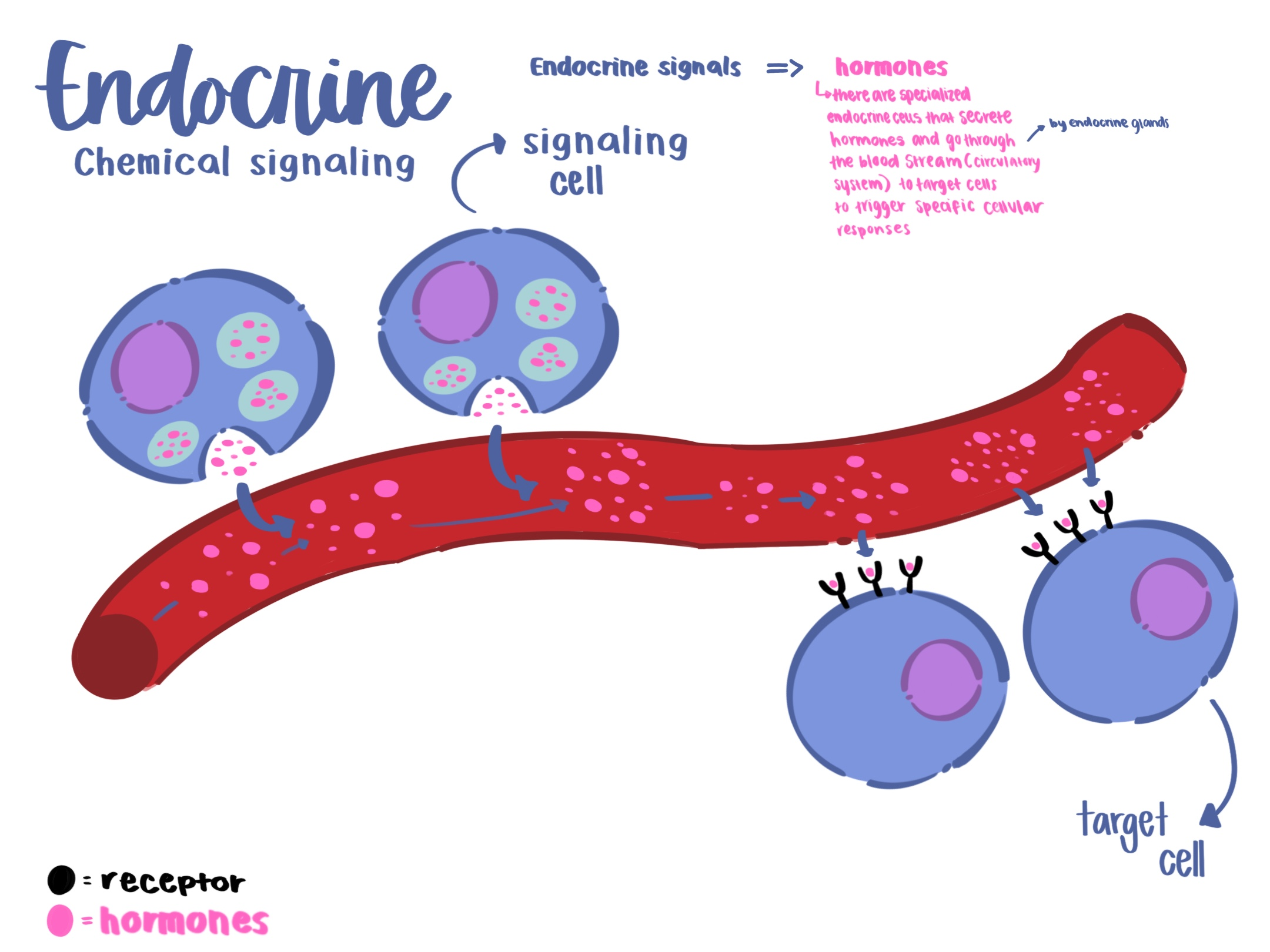
This image displays endocrine signaling, the process by which endocrine glands produce hormones that are released into the bloodstream, allowing them to travel to distant target cells and bind to specific receptors, triggering a cellular response.

Endocrine signals are called hormones. Hormones are produced by endocrine cells and they travel through the blood to reach all parts of the body. Specificity of signaling can be controlled if only some cells can respond to a particular hormone. Endocrine signaling involves the release of hormones by internal glands of an organism directly into the circulatory system, regulating distant target organs. In vertebrates, the hypothalamus is the neural control center for all endocrine systems. In humans, the major endocrine glands are the thyroid gland and the adrenal glands. The study of the endocrine system and its disorders is known as endocrinology.

== Receptors ==
Transmembrane receptor working principle

Cells receive information from their neighbors through a class of proteins known as receptors. Receptors may bind with some molecules (ligands) or may interact with physical agents like light, mechanical temperature, pressure, etc. Reception occurs when the target cell (any cell with a receptor protein specific to the signal molecule) detects a signal, usually in the form of a small, water-soluble molecule, via binding to a receptor protein on the cell surface, or once inside the cell, the signaling molecule can bind to intracellular receptors, other elements, or stimulate enzyme activity (e.g. gasses), as in intracrine signaling.

Signaling molecules interact with a target cell as a ligand to cell surface receptors, and/or by entering into the cell through its membrane or endocytosis for intracrine signaling. This generally results in the activation of second messengers, leading to various physiological effects. In many mammals, early embryo cells exchange signals with cells of the uterus. In the human gastrointestinal tract, bacteria exchange signals with each other and with human epithelial and immune system cells. For the yeast Saccharomyces cerevisiae during mating, some cells send a peptide signal (mating factor pheromones) into their environment. The mating factor peptide may bind to a cell surface receptor on other yeast cells and induce them to prepare for mating.

=== Cell surface receptors ===
Cell surface receptors play an essential role in the biological systems of single- and multi-cellular organisms and malfunction or damage to these proteins is associated with cancer, heart disease, and asthma. These trans-membrane receptors are able to transmit information from outside the cell to the inside because they change conformation when a specific ligand binds to it. There are three major types: Ion channel linked receptors, G protein–coupled receptors, and enzyme-linked receptors.

==== Ion channel linked receptors ====
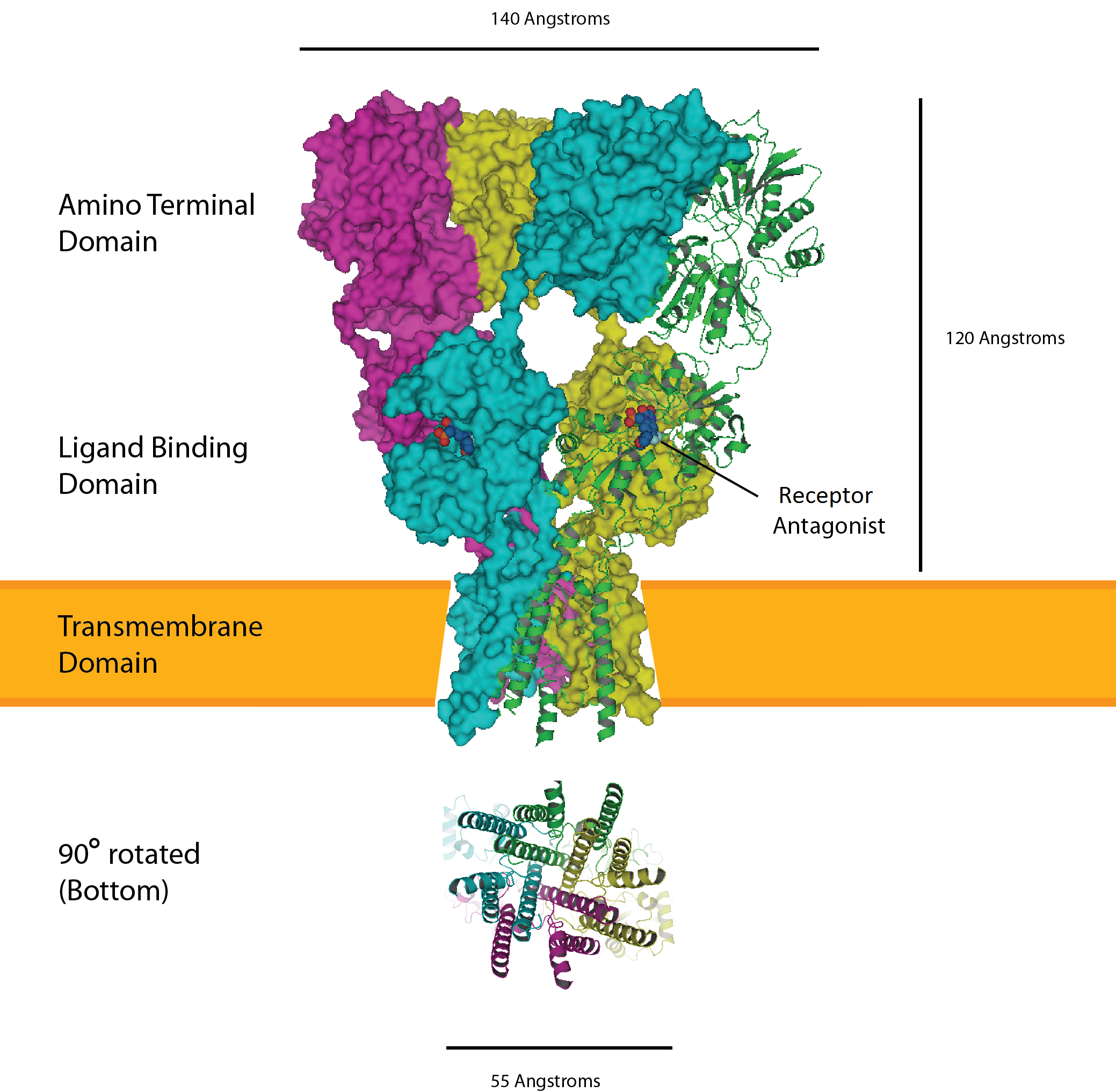
The AMPA receptor bound to a glutamate antagonist showing the amino terminal, ligand binding, and transmembrane domain, PDB: 3KG2

Ion channel linked receptors are a group of transmembrane ion-channel proteins which open to allow ions such as Na^{+}, K^{+}, Ca^{2+}, and/or Cl^{−} to pass through the membrane in response to the binding of a chemical messenger (i.e. a ligand), such as a neurotransmitter.

When a presynaptic neuron is excited, it releases a neurotransmitter from vesicles into the synaptic cleft. The neurotransmitter then binds to receptors located on the postsynaptic neuron. If these receptors are ligand-gated ion channels (LICs), a resulting conformational change opens the ion channels, which leads to a flow of ions across the cell membrane. This, in turn, results in either a depolarization, for an excitatory receptor response, or a hyperpolarization, for an inhibitory response.

These receptor proteins are typically composed of at least two different domains: a transmembrane domain which includes the ion pore, and an extracellular domain which includes the ligand binding location (an allosteric binding site). This modularity has enabled a 'divide and conquer' approach to finding the structure of the proteins (crystallising each domain separately). The function of such receptors located at synapses is to convert the chemical signal of presynaptically released neurotransmitter directly and very quickly into a postsynaptic electrical signal. Many LICs are additionally modulated by allosteric ligands, by channel blockers, ions, or the membrane potential. LICs are classified into three superfamilies which lack evolutionary relationship: cys-loop receptors, ionotropic glutamate receptors and ATP-gated channels.

==== G protein–coupled receptors ====
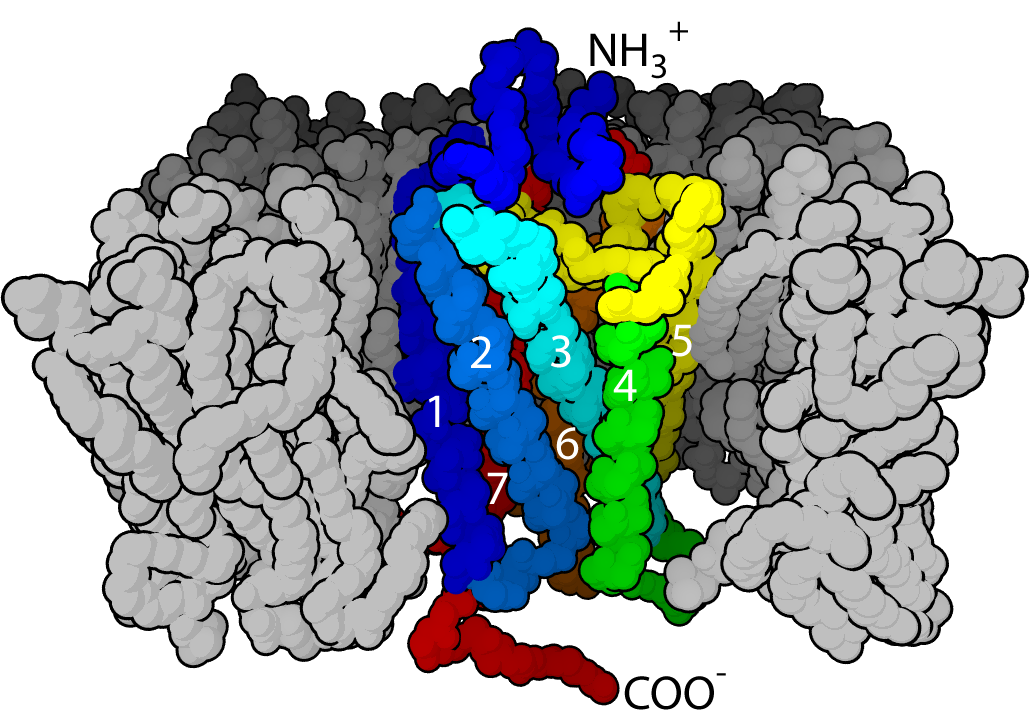
A G protein-coupled receptor within the plasma membrane

G protein-coupled receptors are a large group of evolutionarily-related proteins that are cell surface receptors that detect molecules outside the cell and activate cellular responses. Coupling with G proteins, they are also called seven-transmembrane receptors because they pass through the cell membrane seven times. The G-protein acts as a "middle man" transferring the signal from its activated receptor to its target and therefore indirectly regulates that target protein. Ligands can bind either to extracellular N-terminus and loops (e.g. glutamate receptors) or to the binding site within transmembrane helices (Rhodopsin-like family). They are all activated by agonists although a spontaneous auto-activation of an empty receptor can also be observed.

G protein-coupled receptors are found only in eukaryotes, including yeast, choanoflagellates, and animals. The ligands that bind and activate these receptors include light-sensitive compounds, odors, pheromones, hormones, and neurotransmitters, and vary in size from small molecules to peptides to large proteins. G protein-coupled receptors are involved in many diseases.

There are two principal signal transduction pathways involving the G-protein coupled receptors: cAMP signal pathway and phosphatidylinositol signal pathway. When a ligand binds to the GPCR it causes a conformational change in the GPCR, which allows it to act as a guanine nucleotide exchange factor (GEF). The GPCR can then activate an associated G protein by exchanging the GDP bound to the G protein for a GTP. The G protein's α subunit, together with the bound GTP, can then dissociate from the β and γ subunits to further affect intracellular signaling proteins or target functional proteins directly depending on the α subunit type (G_{αs}, G_{αi/o}, G_{αq/11}, G_{α12/13}).

G protein-coupled receptors are an important drug target and approximately 34% of all Food and Drug Administration (FDA) approved drugs target 108 members of this family. The global sales volume for these drugs is estimated to be 180 billion US dollars as of 2018. It is estimated that GPCRs are targets for about 50% of drugs currently on the market, mainly due to their involvement in signaling pathways related to many diseases i.e. mental, metabolic including endocrinological disorders, immunological including viral infections, cardiovascular, inflammatory, senses disorders, and cancer. The long ago discovered association between GPCRs and many endogenous and exogenous substances, resulting in e.g. analgesia, is another dynamically developing field of pharmaceutical research.

==== Enzyme-linked receptors ====
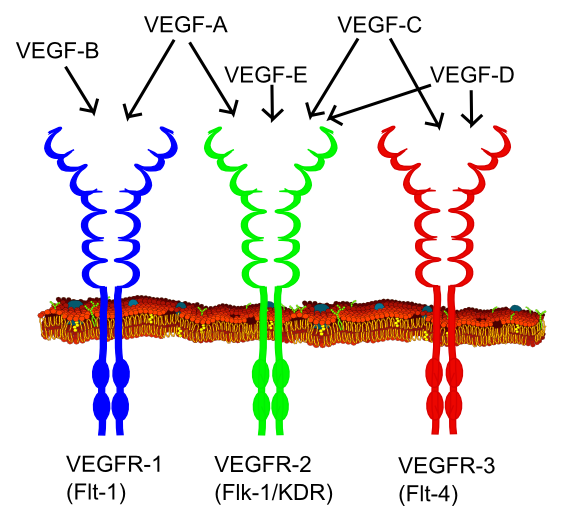
VEGF receptors are a type of enzyme-coupled receptors, specifically tyrosine kinase receptors

Enzyme-linked receptors (or catalytic receptors) are transmembrane receptors that, upon activation by an extracellular ligand, causes enzymatic activity on the intracellular side. Hence a catalytic receptor is an integral membrane protein possessing both enzymatic, catalytic, and receptor functions.

They have two important domains, an extra-cellular ligand binding domain and an intracellular domain, which has a catalytic function; and a single transmembrane helix. The signaling molecule binds to the receptor on the outside of the cell and causes a conformational change on the catalytic function located on the receptor inside the cell. Examples of the enzymatic activity include:

- Receptor tyrosine kinase, as in fibroblast growth factor receptor. Most enzyme-linked receptors are of this type.
- Receptor protein serine/threonine kinase, as in bone morphogenetic protein
- Guanylate cyclase, as in atrial natriuretic factor receptor

=== Intracellular receptors ===
Intracellular receptors exist freely in the cytoplasm, nucleus, or can be bound to organelles or membranes. For example, the presence of nuclear and mitochondrial receptors is well documented. The binding of a ligand to the intracellular receptor typically induces a response in the cell. Intracellular receptors often have a level of specificity, this allows the receptors to initiate certain responses when bound to a corresponding ligand. Intracellular receptors typically act on lipid soluble molecules. The receptors bind to a group of DNA binding proteins. Upon binding, the receptor-ligand complex translocates to the nucleus where they can alter patterns of gene expression.

Steroid hormone receptors are found in the nucleus, cytosol, and also on the plasma membrane of target cells. They are generally intracellular receptors (typically cytoplasmic or nuclear) and initiate signal transduction for steroid hormones which lead to changes in gene expression over a time period of hours to days. The best studied steroid hormone receptors are members of the nuclear receptor subfamily 3 (NR3) that include receptors for estrogen (group NR3A) and 3-ketosteroids (group NR3C). In addition to nuclear receptors, several G protein-coupled receptors and ion channels act as cell surface receptors for certain steroid hormones.

== Mechanisms of Receptor Down-Regulation ==
Receptor mediated endocytosis is a common way of turning receptors "off". Endocytic down regulation is regarded as a means for reducing receptor signaling. The process involves the binding of a ligand to the receptor, which then triggers the formation of coated pits, the coated pits transform to coated vesicles and are transported to the endosome.

Receptor Phosphorylation is another type of receptor down-regulation. Biochemical changes can reduce receptor affinity for a ligand.

Reducing the sensitivity of the receptor is a result of receptors being occupied for a long time. This results in a receptor adaptation in which the receptor no longer responds to the signaling molecule. Many receptors have the ability to change in response to ligand concentration.

== Signal transduction pathways ==
When binding to the signaling molecule, the receptor protein changes in some way and starts the process of transduction, which can occur in a single step or as a series of changes in a sequence of different molecules (called a signal transduction pathway). The molecules that compose these pathways are known as relay molecules. The multistep process of the transduction stage is often composed of the activation of proteins by addition or removal of phosphate groups or even the release of other small molecules or ions that can act as messengers. The amplification of a signal is one of the benefits to this multiple step sequence. Other benefits include more opportunities for regulation than simpler systems do and the fine-tuning of the response, in both unicellular and multicellular organisms.

In some cases, receptor activation caused by ligand binding to a receptor is directly coupled to the cell's response to the ligand. For example, the neurotransmitter GABA can activate a cell surface receptor that is part of an ion channel. GABA binding to a GABA_{A} receptor on a neuron opens a chloride-selective ion channel that is part of the receptor. GABA_{A} receptor activation allows negatively charged chloride ions to move into the neuron, which inhibits the ability of the neuron to produce action potentials. However, for many cell surface receptors, ligand-receptor interactions are not directly linked to the cell's response. The activated receptor must first interact with other proteins inside the cell before the ultimate physiological effect of the ligand on the cell's behavior is produced. Often, the behavior of a chain of several interacting cell proteins is altered following receptor activation. The entire set of cell changes induced by receptor activation is called a signal transduction mechanism or pathway.

Key components of a signal transduction pathway (MAPK/ERK pathway shown)

A more complex signal transduction pathway is the MAPK/ERK pathway, which involves changes of protein–protein interactions inside the cell, induced by an external signal. Many growth factors bind to receptors at the cell surface and stimulate cells to progress through the cell cycle and divide. Several of these receptors are kinases that start to phosphorylate themselves and other proteins when binding to a ligand. This phosphorylation can generate a binding site for a different protein and thus induce protein–protein interaction. In this case, the ligand (called epidermal growth factor, or EGF) binds to the receptor (called EGFR). This activates the receptor to phosphorylate itself. The phosphorylated receptor binds to an adaptor protein (GRB2), which couples the signal to further downstream signaling processes. For example, one of the signal transduction pathways that are activated is called the mitogen-activated protein kinase (MAPK) pathway. The signal transduction component labeled as "MAPK" in the pathway was originally called "ERK," so the pathway is called the MAPK/ERK pathway. The MAPK protein is an enzyme, a protein kinase that can attach phosphate to target proteins such as the transcription factor MYC and, thus, alter gene transcription and, ultimately, cell cycle progression. Many cellular proteins are activated downstream of the growth factor receptors (such as EGFR) that initiate this signal transduction pathway.

Some signaling transduction pathways respond differently, depending on the amount of signaling received by the cell. For instance, the hedgehog protein activates different genes, depending on the amount of hedgehog protein present.

Complex multi-component signal transduction pathways provide opportunities for feedback, signal amplification, and interactions inside one cell between multiple signals and signaling pathways.

A specific cellular response is the result of the transduced signal in the final stage of cell signaling. This response can essentially be any cellular activity that is present in a body. It can spur the rearrangement of the cytoskeleton, or even as catalysis by an enzyme. These three steps of cell signaling all ensure that the right cells are behaving as told, at the right time, and in synchronization with other cells and their own functions within the organism. At the end, the end of a signal pathway leads to the regulation of cellular activity. This response can take place in the nucleus or in the cytoplasm of the cell. A majority of signaling pathways control protein synthesis by turning certain genes on and off in the nucleus.

In unicellular organisms such as bacteria, signaling can be used to 'activate' peers from a dormant state, enhance virulence, defend against bacteriophages, etc. In quorum sensing, which is also found in social insects, the multiplicity of individual signals has the potentiality to create a positive feedback loop, generating coordinated response. In this context, the signaling molecules are called autoinducers. This signaling mechanism may have been involved in evolution from unicellular to multicellular organisms. Bacteria also use contact-dependent signaling, notably to limit their growth.

Signaling molecules used by multicellular organisms are often called pheromones. They can have such purposes as alerting against danger, indicating food supply, or assisting in reproduction.

=== Short-term cellular responses ===
Brief overview of some signaling pathways (based on receptor families) that result in short-acting cellular responses
| Receptor Family | Example of Ligands/ activators (Bracket: receptor for it) | Example of effectors | Further downstream effects |
|---|---|---|---|
| Ligand Gated Ion Channels | Acetylcholine (such as Nicotinic acetylcholine receptor), | Changes in membrane permeability | Change in membrane potential |
| Seven Helix Receptor | Light (Rhodopsin), Dopamine (Dopamine receptor), GABA (GABA receptor), Prostaglandin (prostaglandin receptor) etc. | Trimeric G protein | Adenylate Cyclase, cGMP phosphodiesterase, G-protein gated ion channel, etc. |
| Two-component | Diverse activators | Histidine Kinase | Response Regulator - flagellar movement, Gene expression |
| Membrane Guanylyl Cyclase | Atrial natriuretic peptide, Sea urchin egg peptide etc. | cGMP | Regulation of Kinases and channels- Diverse actions |
| Cytoplasmic Guanylyl cyclase | Nitric Oxide (Nitric oxide receptor) | cGMP | Regulation of cGMP Gated channels, Kinases |
| Integrins | Fibronectins, other extracellular matrix proteins | Nonreceptor tyrosine kinase | Diverse response |

=== Regulating gene activity ===
Brief overview of some signaling pathways (based on receptor families) that control gene activity
| Frizzled (special type of 7Helix receptor) | Wnt | Dishevelled, axin - APC, GSK3-beta - Beta catenin | Gene expression |
| Two-component | Diverse activators | Histidine Kinase | Response Regulator - flagellar movement, Gene expression |
| Receptor Tyrosine Kinase | Insulin (insulin receptor), EGF (EGF receptor), FGF-Alpha, FGF-Beta, etc. (FGF-receptors) | Ras, MAP-kinases, PLC, PI3-Kinase | Gene expression change |
| Cytokine receptors | Erythropoietin, Growth Hormone (Growth Hormone Receptor), IFN-Gamma (IFN-Gamma receptor) etc. | JAK kinase | STAT transcription factor - Gene expression |
| Tyrosine kinase Linked- receptors | MHC-peptide complex - TCR, Antigens - BCR | Cytoplasmic Tyrosine Kinase | Gene expression |
| Receptor Serine/Threonine Kinase | Activin (activin receptor), Inhibin, Bone-morphogenetic protein (BMP Receptor), TGF-beta | Smad transcription factors | Control of gene expression |
| Sphingomyelinase linked receptors | IL-1 (IL-1 receptor), TNF (TNF-receptors) | Ceramide activated kinases | Gene expression |
| Cytoplasmic Steroid receptors | Steroid hormones, Thyroid hormones, Retinoic acid etc. | Work as/ interact with transcription factors | Gene expression |

Signal transduction pathways that lead to a cellular response

==== Notch signaling pathway ====
Notch-mediated juxtacrine signal between adjacent cells

Notch is a cell surface protein that functions as a receptor. Animals have a small set of genes that code for signaling proteins that interact specifically with Notch receptors and stimulate a response in cells that express Notch on their surface. Molecules that activate (or, in some cases, inhibit) receptors can be classified as hormones, neurotransmitters, cytokines, and growth factors, in general called receptor ligands. Ligand receptor interactions such as that of the Notch receptor interaction, are known to be the main interactions responsible for cell signaling mechanisms and communication. Notch acts as a receptor for ligands that are expressed on adjacent cells. While some receptors are cell-surface proteins, others are found inside cells. For example, estrogen is a hydrophobic molecule that can pass through the lipid bilayer of the membranes. As part of the endocrine system, intracellular estrogen receptors from a variety of cell types (such as ovary, prostate, lung, cardiovascular and central nervous systems) can be activated by estrogen produced in the ovaries.

In the case of Notch-mediated signaling, the signal transduction mechanism can be relatively simple. As shown in Figure 2, the activation of Notch can cause the Notch protein to be altered by a protease. Part of the Notch protein is released from the cell surface membrane and takes part in gene regulation. Cell signaling research involves studying the spatial and temporal dynamics of both receptors and the components of signaling pathways that are activated by receptors in various cell types. Emerging methods for single-cell mass-spectrometry analysis promise to enable studying signal transduction with single-cell resolution.

In notch signaling, direct contact between cells allows for precise control of cell differentiation during embryonic development. In the worm Caenorhabditis elegans, two cells of the developing gonad each have an equal chance of terminally differentiating or becoming a uterine precursor cell that continues to divide. The choice of which cell continues to divide is controlled by competition of cell surface signals. One cell will happen to produce more of a cell surface protein that activates the Notch receptor on the adjacent cell. This activates a feedback loop or system that reduces Notch expression in the cell that will differentiate and that increases Notch on the surface of the cell that continues as a stem cell.

== See also ==
- Scaffold protein
- Biosemiotics
- Molecular cellular cognition
- Crosstalk (biology)
- Bacterial outer membrane vesicles
- Membrane vesicle trafficking
- Host–pathogen interaction
- Retinoic acid
- JAK-STAT signaling pathway
- Imd pathway
- Localisation signal
- Oscillation
- Protein dynamics
- Systems biology
- Lipid signaling
- Redox signaling
- Signaling cascade
- Cell Signaling Technology – an antibody development and production company
- Netpath – a curated resource of signal transduction pathways in humans
- Synthetic Biology Open Language
- Nanoscale networking – leveraging biological signaling to construct ad hoc in vivo communication networks
- Soliton model in neuroscience – physical communication via sound waves in membranes
- Temporal feedback
