= Exocyst complex component 6B =

Protein found in humans

EXOC6B

Identifiers
- Aliases: EXOC6B, SEC15B, SEC15L2, exocyst complex component 6B, SEMDJL3
- External IDs: OMIM: 607880; MGI: 1923164; GeneCards: EXOC6B

Gene location (Human)
| Chr. | Chromosome 2 (human) |
| Band | 2p13.2 | Start | 72,175,984 bp |
| Band | 2p13.2 | End | 72,826,041 bp |

Gene location (Mouse)
| Chr. | Chromosome 6 (mouse) |
| Band | 6|6 C3 | Start | 84,595,469 bp |
| Band | 6|6 C3 | End | 85,046,495 bp |
RNA expression pattern
| Bgee | Human / Mouse (ortholog); Top expressed in: Achilles tendon; internal globus pallidus; corpus callosum; sural nerve; external globus pallidus; pars compacta; pars reticulata; left ventricle; right auricle of heart; apex of heart / Top expressed in: otic vesicle; gastrula; dentate gyrus of hippocampal formation granule cell; primary visual cortex; olfactory epithelium; superior frontal gyrus; central gray substance of midbrain; lumbar subsegment of spinal cord; hippocampus proper; molar; More reference expression data |
| BioGPS | n/a |
Gene ontology
| Molecular function | protein binding |
| Cellular component | exocyst; membrane |
| Biological process | exocytosis; vesicle docking involved in exocytosis; protein transport; Golgi to plasma membrane transport |
Sources:Amigo / QuickGO
Orthologs
| Databases | NCBI: entry; OMA: entry |
| Species | Human | Mouse |
| Entrez | 23233 | 75914 |
| Ensembl | ENSG00000144036 | ENSMUSG00000033769 |
| UniProt | Q9Y2D4 | A6H5Z3 |
| RefSeq (mRNA) | NM_015189; NM_001321729; NM_001321730; NM_001321731; NM_001321733 NM_001321734 | NM_177077 |
| RefSeq (protein) | NP_001308658; NP_001308659; NP_001308660; NP_001308662; NP_001308663 NP_056004 | NP_796051 |
| Location (UCSC) | Chr 2: 72.18 – 72.83 Mb | Chr 6: 84.6 – 85.05 Mb |
| PubMed search |
- Wikidata
| View/Edit Human | View/Edit Mouse |

Exocyst complex component 6B is a protein that in humans is encoded by the EXOC6B gene.

== Function ==
In yeast and rat, Sec15 is part of a multiprotein complex that is required for targeted exocytosis.
