= Kiss-and-run fusion =

Release of neurotransmitters in a synapse

Video of kiss-and-run exocytosis of surface receptors in neuronal cultures

Kiss-and-run fusion is a type of synaptic vesicle release in which the vesicle opens and closes transiently. In this form of exocytosis, the vesicle docks and temporarily fuses at the presynaptic membrane, releasing neurotransmitters across the synapse through a fusion pore. The vesicle can then be quickly reused after fusion due to proper maintenance of its initial structure, allowing for more kinetically efficient energy use.

Kiss-and-run differs from full-fusion, in which secretory vesicles quickly release their contents through the complete dilation of a fusion pore. After these chemical messengers are released into the extracellular space, the vesicle collapses fully into the plasma membrane and is then later retrieved by a clathrin-coat-dependent process.

The idea that neurotransmitter might be released in "quanta" by the fusion of synaptic vesicles with the presynaptic membrane was first introduced by Bernard Katz and Jose del Castillo in 1955, when the first EM images of nerve terminals first appeared. The possibility of transient fusion and rapid retrieval of vesicle membrane was proposed by Bruno Ceccarelli in 1973, after examining in the electron microscope strongly stimulated frog neuromuscular junctions, and indirectly supported by the work of his group in the following years, using electrophysiology, electron microscopy, and quick freezing techniques. The actual term, kiss-and-run, was introduced by Ceccarelli's collaborators after the first studies of simultaneous membrane capacitance and amperometric transmitter release measurements were performed and indicated that secretory products could actually be released during transient vesicle fusion.

Today, there is back and forth debate over full fusion and kiss-and-run fusion and which model portrays a more accurate picture of the mechanisms behind synaptic release. The increased accumulation of partially empty secretory vesicles following secretion, observed in electron micrographs, are the most compelling evidence in favor of the kiss-and-run model. This accumulation suggests that during the secretory process, only a portion of the vesicular contents are able to exit the cell, which could only be possible if secretory vesicles were to temporarily establish continuity with the cell plasma membrane, expel a portion of their contents, then detach and reseal.

== Discovery ==
Transient vesicle fusion was hypothesized by Katz and del Castillo in 1955. However, the first systematic studies were conducted by Ceccarelli et al. in 1973, using tetanic stimulation. Ceccarelli et al. studied frog neuromuscular junctions, stimulating them with markers such as horseradish peroxidase (HRP) to identify endocytosed organelles, and using either mild stimulation (2 Hz) or strong stimulation (10 Hz) protocols for periods ranging from 20 minutes to 4 hours. At low stimulation for a period of 4 hours, Ceccarelli et al. found that there was an increase in HRP labeled vesicles over time, and no increases in large organelles, indicative of the vesicles fusing quickly with the presynaptic membrane and then separating after releasing its neurotransmitters. They hypothesized that at low frequencies of stimulation, most of the vesicles are quickly re-formed from the presynaptic membrane during and after stimulation. Further studies in Ceccarelli's lab accumulated evidence on the hypothesis of transient fusion by comparing electrophysiological and morphological data. In particular, images of vesicle fusions were examined on freeze-fractured presynaptic membranes and on electron-microscope images obtained from terminals quick-frozen few ms after the delivery of a single shock to the nerve. In 1993, Alvarez de Toledo and colleagues directly demonstrated the occurrence of secretory product release during the momentary opening of a transiently fusing vesicle, by combining the measurement of membrane capacitance (that monitors changes in surface area) with amperometric detection of the release of mediators. This led Fesce et al. to recapitulate all the indirect evidence in favor of transient fusion and coin the term kiss-and-run. The most compelling evidence for transient or kiss-and-run fusion has come from the discovery of the porosome, a permanent cup-shaped lipoprotein structure at the cell plasma membrane, where secretory vesicles transiently dock and fuse to release intra-vesicular contents from the cell.

== Evidence for kiss-and-run ==
With the discovery of the kiss-and-run mechanism by Ceccarelli et al., there have been many subsequent studies done that give evidence supporting kiss-and-run fusion. All studies have suggested that there are two main advantages kiss-and-run fusion has over full fusion: 1) kiss-and-run enables more efficient vesicle recycling, as the secretory vesicle's form remains stable and 2) kiss-and-run can limit how much neurotransmitter is released due to a smaller fusion pore and a shorter time during which neurotransmitters can actually be released

One of the major problems of kiss-and-run evidence, and subsequently the basis for many counterarguments against kiss-and-run, is that because fusion is so short, it is very hard to capture an actual kiss-and-run event. However, accumulation of partially empty vesicles following secretion strongly favors the kiss-and-run mechanism, suggesting that during the secretory process, only a portion of the vesicular contents are able to exit the cell, which could only be possible if secretory vesicles were to temporarily establish continuity with the cell plasma membrane, expel a portion of their contents, then detach and reseal. Since porosomes are permanent structures at the cell plasma membrane measuring just a fraction of the secretory vesicle size, demonstrates that secretory vesicles "transiently" dock and establish continuity, as opposed to complete collapse.

=== Rat pancreatic beta cells ===
Rat pancreatic beta cells release neurotransmitters through kiss-and-run fusion. In endocrine and neuroendocrine cells, synaptic-like vesicles (SLVs) undergo kiss-and-run, but it's been controversial whether large dense-core vesicles (LDCVs) also undergo kiss-and-run. Studies have shown that LDCVs do undergo kiss-and-run exocytosis. MacDonald et al. used multiple approaches to test for kiss-and-run exocytosis in rat beta cells. By monitoring membrane patches of intact rat beta cells in the presence of 10 mM glucose and 5 mM forskolin, MacDonald et al. found that some vesicles underwent kiss-and-run, as seen by an exocytotic event followed by an endocytotic event of a similar magnitude. Kiss-and-run events accounted for 25% of LDCV exocytosis and 28% of SLV exocytosis. While LDCV kiss-and-run occurred 25% of the time in the presence of forskolin, in the absence of forskolin, LDCV kiss-and-run fusion occurred only 7% of the time. Because forskolin raises cyclic AMP (cAMP) levels, cAMP seemingly plays a very important role in the mechanism in LDCV kiss-and-run fusion in rat pancreatic beta cells.

SLV (pore diameter: 0.8 +/- 0.1 nm) and LDCV (pore diameter: 1.4 +/- 0.1 nm) fusion pores during kiss-and-run have been shown to be big enough to allow for efflux of gamma-aminobutyric acid (GABA) and adenosine triphosphate (ATP), but are too small to release insulin in rat pancreatic beta cells. Thus, the kiss-and-run mechanism could be implicated in medical complications involving insulin.

=== Hippocampal synapses ===
Kiss-and-run exocytosis has been shown to occur at the synapses of neurons located in the hippocampus. Studies using FM1-43, an amphiphile dye inserted into the vesicles or membrane as a marker, have been instrumental in supporting kiss-and-run in hippocampal synapses. In hippocampal synapses, vesicles have been shown to allow the normal release of glutamate, an excitatory neurotransmitter in the brain, without permitting FM1-43 dye to enter or escape from the vesicle, indicating a transient mechanism suggestive of kiss-and-run. Increases in osmolarity have also been shown to permit less dye release in hippocampal synapses. In varying hypertonic solutions, 70% more FM1-43 dye was released from vesicles stimulated in 0.5 osM than from vesicles stimulated in 1.5 osM. Vesicles located in hypertonic regions of the body therefore might be more likely to undergo a kiss-and-run mode of exocytosis.

=== Mitochondrial Examples ===
Mitochondria demonstrate kiss-and-run fusion in exchanging inner membrane materials. Studies using mitochondrial matrix-targeted green-photoactivated, red-fluorescent KFP and cyan-photoactivated, green-fluorescence PAGFP in rat cells have shown interactions where the KFP and PAGFP were transferred from one mitochondrion to another mitochondrion through transient fusion, suggesting a kiss-and-run mechanism. Unlike full fusion of mitochondria, which resulted in a single organelle, transient kiss-and-run fusion of two mitochondria resulted in two distinct membranes.

Manipulation of the optic atrophy 1 (Opa1) gene had interesting effects on fusion between mitochondria. Silencing the Opa1 gene decreased full fusion activity of mitochondria after 24 hours, and full fusion activity was completely eliminated after the Opa1 gene was silenced for 48 hours. Transient kiss-and-run fusion activity remained the same after 24 hours of Opa1 silencing. Kiss-and-run fusion is most common with low levels of Opa1 gene expression and extremely high levels of Opa1 gene expression. As a result, Opa1 expression governs fusion in mitochondria with regard to kiss-and-run.

Kiss-and-run fusion in mitochondria help to keep mitochondria in a reduced motility state for shorter period of time compared to full fusion. Liu et al. tested both kiss-and-run and full fusion and their effects on mitochondrial motility, and found that both forms of fusion resulted in decreased mitochondrial motility at first, but kiss-and-run fusion restored, and even increased, mitochondrial motility immediately after the kiss-and-run event was over. Kiss-and-run fusion provides a better mechanism to control mitochondrial bioenergetics than full fusion.

Comparing the initial fusions, the kiss-and-run fusion model continues during active mitochondrial movement, as they approach sidelong and indirectly, often connected to different microtubule complexes. However, complete fusions require motion across a single microtubule, in a head-to-tail manner.

== Regulation ==
=== Calcium-dependent actin coating ===
Kiss-and-run fusion has been thought to be stabilized by an actin coating of vesicles. Testing for the vesicle uptake of FM1-43 to note when vesicles fused with the membrane allowed researchers to notice that actin coating is a necessary step for the kiss-and-run mechanism. Vesicles labelled with the Beta-actin-green fluorescent protein (GFP) fluoresced seconds after fusing with the presynaptic membrane (as shown by FM1-43 uptake), but non-fused vesicles never fluoresced, suggesting that an actin coating is required for kiss-and-run. This actin coating came from the polymerization of actin monomers.

The actin coating process necessary for transient kiss-and-run fusion is mediated by calcium. Actin coating of vesicles was inhibited by BAPTA-AM, which removes calcium. With the absence of calcium through the use of BAPTA-AM, all fused vesicles remained attached to the presynaptic membrane but did not release its neurotransmitters, suggesting that calcium is required to make the actin coating, and that the actin coating is responsible in the mechanism for vesicle unloading or vesicle release.

=== Myosin II ===
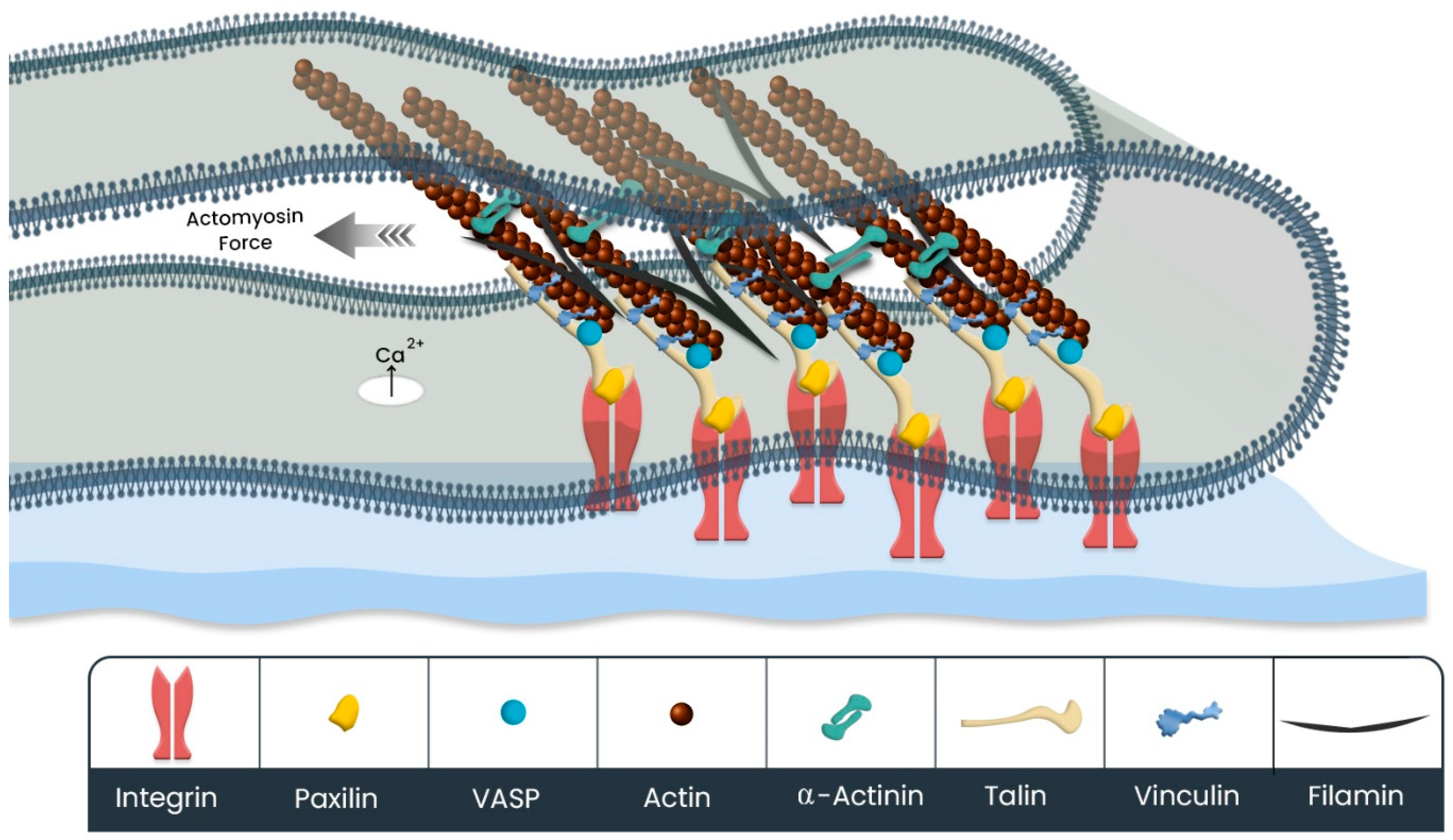
Contextual visual of Myosin II method of action

Studies using total internal reflection fluorescence microscopy (TIRFM) in neuroendocrine PC12 cells showed that myosin II supports modulation of the transient fusion pore during kiss-and-run exocytosis. Over-expression of normal myosin II regulatory light chain (RLC) in mRFP (monomeric red fluorescent protein) tagged tissue and Venus-tagged brain tissue resulted in prolonged release kinetics, while over-expression of a mutant form of myosin II RLC short shortened release kinetics. Prolonged release kinetics is indicative of a slower closing of the fusion pore, as myosin II also regulates how much neurotransmitter is released during kiss-and-run exocytosis.

== Role of the SNAREs Complex ==
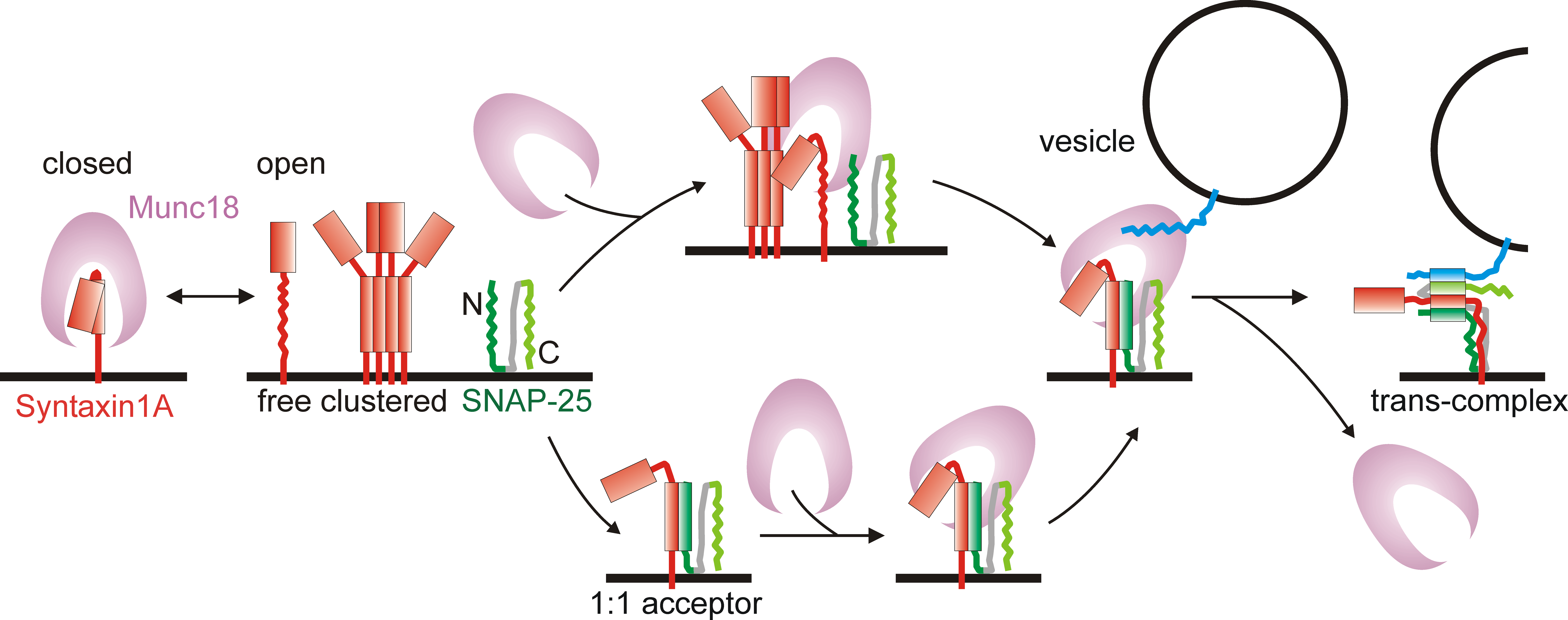
Mechanisms of the SNARE complex resulting in trans-configuration, facilitated by Munc18

Much scholarly debate exists over the role of SNARE proteins in kiss-and-run exocytosis. Initiated by calcium-dependent synaptogamins, SNARE proteins mediate vesicle fusion, through the conjoining of the secretory vesicle and plasma membrane. When a vesicle fuses with the presynaptic membrane, a SNARE transition occurs from a trans position binding to a cis position, facilitated by Munc18-1 proteins and followed by SNARE dissociation. This process was thought to be irreversible. If kiss-and-run exocytosis occurs, however, then it would suggest that reversible association of SNARE proteins occurs and mediates the kiss-and-run mode of exocytosis. Manipulation of the SNARE proteins during kiss-and-run may give more insight to how the two relate, and more scholarly research is required.
