= Oscillation (cell signaling) =

Type of cell signaling

Oscillations are an important type of cell signaling characterized by the periodic change of the system in time. Oscillations can take place in a biological system in a multitude of ways. Positive feedback loops, on their own or in combination with negative feedback are a common feature of oscillating biological systems.

== Examples ==
=== Genetic oscillation ===
One of the most common forms of biological oscillation is genetic oscillation, which can take place when a transcription factor binds and represses its own promoter. This type of regulatory system is able to successfully describe the NFkB-IkB and p53-Mdm52 biological oscillating systems.

=== Relaxation oscillations ===
Relaxation oscillation takes place in the context of a bi-stable system. It is characterized by the periodic switching between two stable states.
