= Vesicle fusion =

Vesicle fusion is the merging of a vesicle with other vesicles or a part of a cell membrane. In the latter case, it is the end stage of secretion from secretory vesicles, where their contents are expelled from the cell through exocytosis. Vesicles can also fuse with other target cell compartments, such as a lysosome. Exocytosis occurs when secretory vesicles transiently dock and fuse at the base of cup-shaped structures at the cell plasma membrane called porosomes, the universal secretory machinery in cells. Vesicle fusion may depend on SNARE proteins in the presence of increased intracellular calcium (Ca^{2+}) concentration.

== Triggers ==
Stimuli that trigger vesicle fusion act by increasing intracellular Ca^{2+}.

- Synaptic vesicles commit vesicle fusion by a nerve impulse reaching the synapse, activating voltage-dependent calcium channels that cause influx of Ca^{2+} into the cell.
- In the endocrine system, many hormones are released by their releasing hormones binding to G protein coupled receptors coupled to the G_{q} alpha subunit, activating the IP3/DAG pathway to increase Ca^{2+}. Examples of this mechanism include:
  - Gonadotropin releasing hormone
  - Thyrotropin releasing hormone
  - Growth hormone releasing hormone (minor pathway - main one is cAMP dependent pathway)

== Model systems ==
Model systems consisting of a single phospholipid or a mixture have been studied by physical chemists. Cardiolipin is found mainly in mitochondrial membranes, and calcium ions play an important role in the respiratory processes mediated by the mitochondrion. The forces involved have been postulated to explain this process in terms of nucleation for agglomeration of smaller supramolecular entities or phase changes in the structure of the biomembranes.

== Mechanisms ==
=== Synaptic cleft fusion ===
In synaptic vesicle fusion, the vesicle must be within a few nanometers of the target membrane for the fusion process to begin. This closeness allows the cell membrane and the vesicle to exchange lipids which is mediated by certain proteins which remove water that comes between the forming junction. Once the vesicle is in position it must wait until Ca^{2+} enters the cell by the propagation of an action potential to the presynaptic membrane. Ca^{2+} binds to specific proteins, one of which is Synaptotagmin, in neurons which triggers the complete fusion of the vesicle with the target membrane.

SNARE proteins are also thought to help mediate which membrane is the target of which vesicle.

=== SNARE protein and pore formation ===
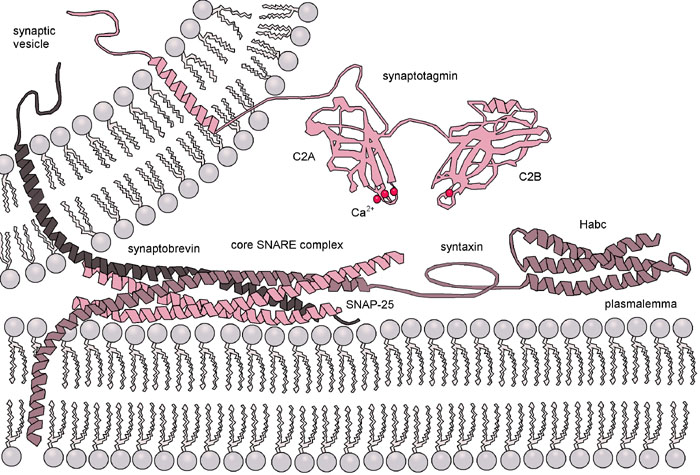
Molecular machinery driving exocytosis in neuromediator release. The core SNARE complex is formed by four α-helices contributed by synaptobrevin, syntaxin and SNAP-25, synaptotagmin serves as a calcium sensor and regulates intimately the SNARE zipping.

Assembly of the SNAREs into the "trans" complexes likely bridges the opposing lipid bilayers of membranes belonging to cell and secretory granule, bringing them in proximity and inducing their fusion. The influx of calcium into the cell triggers the completion of the assembly reaction, which is mediated by an interaction between the putative calcium sensor, synaptotagmin, with membrane lipids and/or the partially assembled SNARE complex.

One hypothesis implicates the molecule Complexin within the SNARE complex and its interaction with the molecule synaptotagmin. Known as the "clamp" hypothesis, the presence of complexin normally inhibits the fusion of the vesicle to the cell membrane. However, binding of calcium ions to synaptotagmin triggers the complexin to be released or inactivated, so that the vesicle is then free to fuse.

According to the "zipper" hypothesis, the complex assembly starts at the N-terminal parts of SNARE motifs and proceeds towards the C-termini that anchor interacting proteins in membranes. Formation of the "trans"-SNARE complex proceeds through an intermediate complex composed of SNAP-25 and syntaxin-1, which later accommodates synaptobrevin-2 (the quoted syntaxin and synaptobrevin isotypes participate in neuronal neuromediator release).

Based on the stability of the resultant cis-SNARE complex, it has been postulated that energy released during the assembly process serves as a means for overcoming the repulsive forces between the membranes. There are several models that propose explanation of a subsequent step – the formation of stalk and fusion pore, but the exact nature of these processes remains debated. Two of the most prominent models on fusion pore formation are the lipid-lined and protein-lined fusion pore theories.

==== Lipid-lined fusion pore theory ====
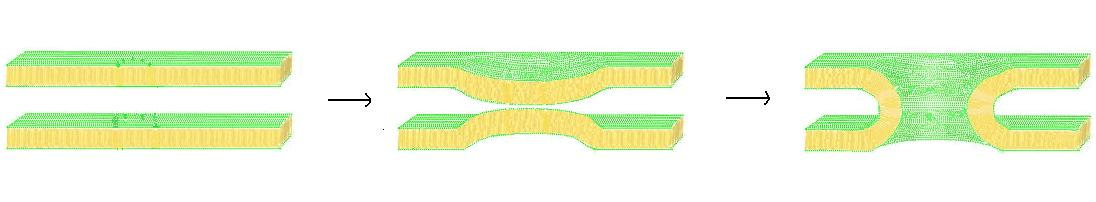
In the lipid-lined pore theory both membranes curve toward each other to form the early fusion pore. When the two membranes are brought to a "critical" distance, the lipid head-groups from one membrane insert into the other, creating the basis for the fusion pore.

One possible model for fusion pore formation is the lipid-line pore theory. In this model, once the membranes have been brought into sufficiently close proximity via the "zipper" mechanism of the SNARE complex, membrane fusion occurs spontaneously. It has been shown that when the two membranes are brought within a critical distance, it is possible for hydrophilic lipid headgroups of one membrane to merge with the opposing membrane. In the lipid-lined fusion pore model, the SNARE complex acts as a scaffold, pulling on the membrane, causing both membranes to pucker so they may reach the critical fusion distance. As the two membranes begin to fuse, a lipid-lined stalk is produced, expanding radially outward as fusion proceeds.

While a lipid-lined pore is possible and can achieve all the same properties observed in early pore formation, sufficient data does not exist to prove it is the sole method of formation. There is not currently a proposed mechanism on inter-cellular regulation for fluctuation of lipid-lined pores, and they would have a substantially more difficult time producing effects such as the "kiss-and-run" when compared with their protein-lined counterparts. Lipid-lined pores effectiveness would also be highly dependent on the composition of both membranes, and its success or failure could vary wildly with changes in elasticity and rigidity.

==== Protein-lined fusion pore theory ====
Another possible model for fusion pore formation is the protein-lined pore theory. In this model, after activation of synaptotagmin by calcium, several SNARE complexes come together to form a ring structure, with synaptobrevin forming the pore in the vesicle membrane and Syntaxin forming the pore in the cell membrane. As the initial pore expands it incorporates lipids from both bilayers, eventually resulting in complete fusion of the two membranes. The SNARE complex has a much more active role in the protein-lined pore theory; because the pore consists initially entirely of SNARE proteins, the pore is easily able to undergo intercellular regulation, making fluctuation and "kiss-and-run" mechanisms easily attainable.

A protein-lined pore perfectly meets all the observed requirements of the early fusion pore, and while some data does support this theory, sufficient data does not exist to pronounce it the primary method of fusion. A protein-lined pore requires at least five copies of the SNARE complex while fusion has been observed with as few as two.

In both theories the function of the SNARE complex remains largely unchanged, and the entire SNARE complex is necessary to initiate fusion. It has, however, been proven that in vitro Syntaxin per se is sufficient to drive spontaneous calcium independent fusion of synaptic vesicles containing v-SNAREs. This suggests that in Ca^{2+}-dependent neuronal exocytosis synaptotagmin is a dual regulator, in absence of Ca^{2+} ions to inhibit SNARE dynamics, while in presence of Ca^{2+} ions to act as agonist in the membrane fusion process.

=== Kiss-and-run hypothesis ===
In synaptic vesicles, some neurochemists have suggested that vesicles occasionally may not completely fuse with presynaptic membranes in neurotransmitter release into the synaptic cleft. The controversy lies in whether or not endocytosis always occurs in vesicle reforming after release of the neurotransmitter. Another proposed mechanism for release of vesicle contents into extracellular fluid is called kiss-and-run fusion.

There is some indication that vesicles may only form a small pore in the presynaptic membrane allowing contents to be released by standard diffusion for a short while before retreating back into the presynaptic cell. This mechanism may be a way around clathrin-mediated endocytosis. It is also proposed that the vesicle does not need to return to an endosome to refill, though it is not thoroughly understood by which mechanism it would refill. This does not exclude full vesicle fusion, but only states that both mechanisms may operate in synaptic clefts.

"Kiss and run" has been shown to occur in endocrine cells, though it has not been directly witnessed in synaptic gaps.

== See also ==
- SNARE
- Presynaptic active zone
- Liposomes used as models for artificial cells in membrane fusion studies.
