= Bhanu Pratap Jena =

American chemist (born 1955)

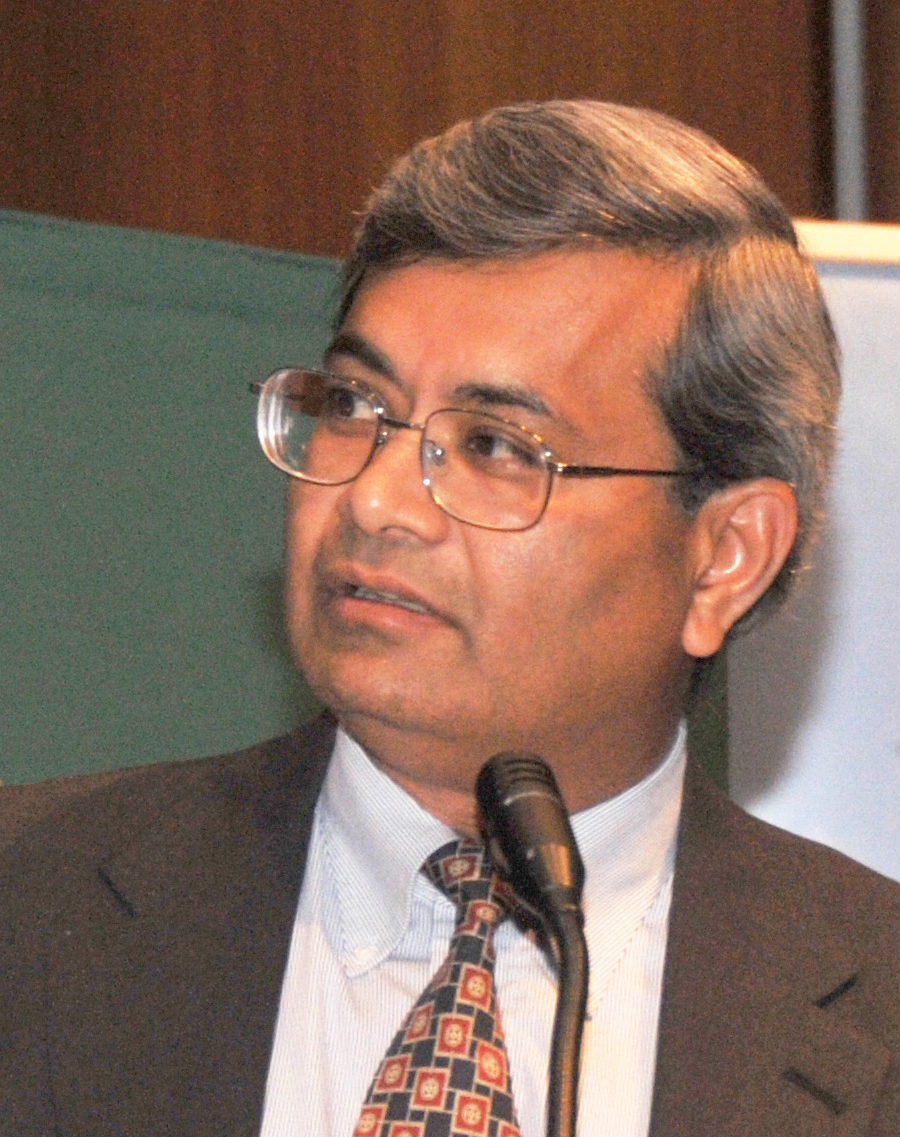
- Jena in 2012
- Born: 1 November 1955 (age 70); Jajpur, Odisha, India
- Education: BJB College, Utkal University, Iowa State University
- Known for: Porosome, membrane fusion
- Awards: Camurus Lipid Science Prize; Distinguished Scientist Award from SEBM; George E. Palade Medal; Hallim Distinguished Award; Sir. Aaron Klug Award; Ranbaxy Award; Fellow AAAS
- Scientific career
- Fields: Chemistry, cell biology

Bhanu Pratap Jena (born November 1, 1955) is an Indian-American cell biologist and the George E. Palade University Professor and Distinguished Professor of Physiology at the Wayne State University School of Medicine, who discovered porosome in the mid-1990s and demonstrated it to be the universal secretory machinery in plasma membrane.

== Biography ==
Jena was born in Jajpur, Odisha, India on November 1, 1955, to Manju and Prafulla Jena.

He majored in Chemistry, Zoology and Botany at BJB College (B.Sc.,1975) and studied Zoology (Endocrinology) at Utkal University (M.Sc.,1978). Following four years of lectureship at various colleges in Utkal University (1978–82), he received a teaching and research fellowship from Iowa State University in 1982 to pursue studies leading to a doctorate degree. In December 1988, he received his PhD in Zoology (Molecular Endocrinology) from Iowa State. Following postdoctoral studies at Iowa State and Yale (1988–1994), he joined Yale University as an assistant professor, and in 2000, joined as professor in the Department of Physiology at Wayne State University School of Medicine.

== Scientific career ==
Using an atomic force microscope on live cells, Jena was the first to report the discovery of a new cellular structure the porosome in the mid-1990s. The porosomes are permanent supramolecular structures at the cell plasma membrane, where secretory vesicles dock and fuse to release intravesicular contents to the outside of the cell. This was a major breakthrough in our understanding of cell secretion. The porosome has been determined as the universal secretory machinery in cells, from exocrine cells of the pancreas, to neuroendocrine cells and neurons. Jena and his research team have determined the structure and dynamics of the porosome in live cells, at nm resolution and in real time. The structure of the porosome was further confirmed by electron microscopy in whole cells, and in isolated porosome preparations. The isolated porosome has been both structurally and functionally reconstituted in lipid membrane and live cells, and its composition determined. The discovery of the porosome, and an understanding of its structure, function, composition, and reconstitution, has opened a new field in cell biology: nano cell biology.
