= Neurotransmission =

Impulse transmission between neurons

The presynaptic neuron (top) releases a neurotransmitter, which activates receptors on the nearby postsynaptic cell (bottom).

Ligand-gated ion channel showing the binding of transmitter (Tr) and changing of membrane potential (Vm)

Neurotransmission (Latin: transmissio "passage, crossing" from transmittere "send, let through") is the process by which signaling molecules called neurotransmitters are released by the axon terminal of a neuron (the presynaptic neuron), and bind to and react with the receptors on the dendrites of another neuron (the postsynaptic neuron) a short distance away. Changes in the concentration of ions, such as Ca^{2+}, Na^{+}, K^{+}, underlie both chemical and electrical activity in the process. The increase in calcium levels is essential and can be promoted by protons. A similar process occurs in retrograde neurotransmission, where the dendrites of the postsynaptic neuron release retrograde neurotransmitters (e.g., endocannabinoids; synthesized in response to a rise in intracellular calcium levels) that signal through receptors that are located on the axon terminal of the presynaptic neuron, mainly at GABAergic and glutamatergic synapses.

Neurotransmission is regulated by several different factors: the availability and rate-of-synthesis of the neurotransmitter, the release of that neurotransmitter, the baseline activity of the postsynaptic cell, the number of available postsynaptic receptors for the neurotransmitter to bind to, and the subsequent removal or deactivation of the neurotransmitter by enzymes or presynaptic reuptake.

In response to a threshold action potential or graded electrical potential, a neurotransmitter is released at the presynaptic terminal. The released neurotransmitter may then move across the synaptic cleft to be bind to receptors in the membrane of the postsynaptic neuron. Binding of neurotransmitters may influence the postsynaptic neuron in either an inhibitory or excitatory way. The binding of neurotransmitters to receptors in the postsynaptic neuron can trigger either short term changes, such as changes in the membrane potential called postsynaptic potentials, or longer term changes by the activation of signaling cascades.

Neurons form complex biological neural networks through which nerve impulses (action potentials) travel. Neurons do not touch each other (except in the case of an electrical synapse through a gap junction); instead, neurons interact at close contact points called synapses. A neuron transports its information by way of an action potential. When the nerve impulse arrives at the synapse, it may cause the release of neurotransmitters, which influence another (postsynaptic) neuron. The postsynaptic neuron may receive inputs from many additional neurons, both excitatory and inhibitory. The excitatory and inhibitory influences are summed, and if the net effect is inhibitory, the neuron will be less likely to "fire" (i.e., generate an action potential), and if the net effect is excitatory, the neuron will be more likely to fire. How likely a neuron is to fire depends on how far its membrane potential is from the threshold potential, the voltage at which an action potential is triggered because enough voltage-dependent sodium channels are activated so that the net inward sodium current exceeds all outward currents. Excitatory inputs bring a neuron closer to threshold, while inhibitory inputs bring the neuron farther from threshold. An action potential is an "all-or-none" event; neurons whose membranes have not reached threshold will not fire, while those that do must fire. Once the action potential is initiated (traditionally at the axon hillock), it will propagate along the axon, leading to release of neurotransmitters at the synaptic bouton to pass along information to yet another adjacent neuron.

== Stages in neurotransmission at the synapse ==
1. Synthesis of the neurotransmitter. This can take place in the cell body, in the axon, or in the axon terminal. Eg. acetylcholine
2. Storage of the neurotransmitter in vesicles in the axon terminal.
3. Before synaptic transmission there is a high concentration of Ca ions outside the axon terminals.
4. Nerve impulse (depolarization) reaches the axon terminal.
5. Depolarization of the presynaptic membrane causes voltage gated Ca2++ to open in the axon terminals
6. Calcium diffuses into the axon terminal causing vesicles adjacent to axon terminals to fuse with the plasma membrane.
7. Fusing results in release of the neurotransmitter into the synaptic cleft.
8. After its release, the transmitter diffuses across the synpatic cleft and binds to neurotransmitter gated ion channels on the membrane of the postsynaptic dendrite (next nerve).
9. Binding of the neurotransmitter stimulates adjacent Na voltage gates channels on the postsynaptic membrane to open and activates a receptor in the postsynaptic membrane.
10. Na diffuses though Na voltage gated channels into postsynaptic dendrite triggering depolarization of the downstream neuron.
11. Deactivation of the neurotransmitter. The neurotransmitter is either destroyed enzymatically, or taken back into the terminal from which it came, where it can be reused, or degraded and removed.

== General description ==
Neurotransmitters are spontaneously packed in vesicles and released in individual quanta-packets independently of presynaptic action potentials. This slow release is detectable and produces micro-inhibitory or micro-excitatory effects on the postsynaptic neuron. An action potential briefly amplifies this process. Neurotransmitters containing vesicles cluster around active sites, and after they have been released may be recycled by one of three proposed mechanisms. The first proposed mechanism involves partial opening and then re-closing of the vesicle. The second two involve the full fusion of the vesicle with the membrane, followed by recycling, or recycling into the endosome. Vesicular fusion is driven largely by the concentration of calcium in micro domains located near calcium channels, allowing for only microseconds of neurotransmitter release, while returning to normal calcium concentration takes a couple of hundred of microseconds. The vesicle exocytosis is thought to be driven by a protein complex called SNARE, that is the target for botulinum toxins. Once released, a neurotransmitter enters the synapse and encounters receptors. Neurotransmitter receptors can either be ionotropic or g protein coupled. Ionotropic receptors allow for ions to pass through when agonized by a ligand. The main model involves a receptor composed of multiple subunits that allow for coordination of ion preference. G protein coupled receptors, also called metabotropic receptors, when bound to by a ligand undergo conformational changes yielding in intracellular response. Termination of neurotransmitter activity is usually done by a transporter, however enzymatic deactivation is also plausible.

== Summation ==
Each neuron connects with numerous other neurons, receiving numerous impulses from them. Summation is the adding together of these impulses at the axon hillock. If the neuron only gets excitatory impulses, it will generate an action potential. If instead the neuron gets as many inhibitory as excitatory impulses, the inhibition cancels out the excitation and the nerve impulse will stop there. Action potential generation is proportionate to the probability and pattern of neurotransmitter release, and to postsynaptic receptor sensitization.

Spatial summation means that the effects of impulses received at different places on the neuron add up, so that the neuron may fire when such impulses are received simultaneously, even if each impulse on its own would not be sufficient to cause firing.

Temporal summation means that the effects of impulses received at the same place can add up if the impulses are received in close temporal succession. Thus the neuron may fire when multiple impulses are received, even if each impulse on its own would not be sufficient to cause firing.

== Convergence and divergence ==
Neurotransmission implies both a convergence and a divergence of information. First one neuron is influenced by many others, resulting in a convergence of input. When the neuron fires, the signal is sent to many other neurons, resulting in a divergence of output. Many other neurons are influenced by this neuron.

== Cotransmission ==
Cotransmission is the release of several types of neurotransmitters from a single nerve terminal.

At the nerve terminal, neurotransmitters are present within 35–50 nm membrane-encased vesicles called synaptic vesicles. To release neurotransmitters, the synaptic vesicles transiently dock and fuse at the base of specialized 10–15 nm cup-shaped lipoprotein structures at the presynaptic membrane called porosomes. The neuronal porosome proteome has been solved, providing the molecular architecture and the complete composition of the machinery.

Recent studies in a myriad of systems have shown that most, if not all, neurons release several different chemical messengers. Cotransmission allows for more complex effects at postsynaptic receptors, and thus allows for more complex communication to occur between neurons.

In modern neuroscience, neurons are often classified by their cotransmitter. For example, striatal "GABAergic neurons" utilize opioid peptides or substance P as their primary cotransmitter.

Some neurons can release at least two neurotransmitters at the same time, the other being a cotransmitter, in order to provide the stabilizing negative feedback required for meaningful encoding, in the absence of inhibitory interneurons. Examples include:

- GABA–glycine co-release.
- Dopamine–glutamate co-release.
- Acetylcholine (ACh)–glutamate co-release.
- ACh–vasoactive intestinal peptide (VIP) co-release.
- ACh–calcitonin gene-related peptide (CGRP) co-release.
- Glutamate–dynorphin co-release (in hippocampus).

Noradrenaline and ATP are sympathetic co-transmitters. It is found that the endocannabinoid anadamide and the cannabinoid WIN 55,212-2 can modify the overall response to sympathetic nerve stimulation, and indicate that prejunctional CB1 receptors mediate the sympatho-inhibitory action. Thus cannabinoids can inhibit both the noradrenergic and purinergic components of sympathetic neurotransmission.

One unusual pair of co-transmitters is GABA and glutamate which are released from the same axon terminals of neurons originating from the ventral tegmental area (VTA), internal globus pallidus, and supramammillary nucleus. The former two project to the habenula whereas the projections from the supramammillary nucleus are known to target the dentate gyrus of the hippocampus.

== Genetic association ==
Neurotransmission is genetically associated with other characteristics or features. For example, enrichment analyses of different signaling pathways led to the discovery of a genetic association with intracranial volume.

== See also ==
- Autoreceptor
- Biological neuron model § Synaptic transmission (Koch & Segev)
- Electrophysiology
- G protein-coupled receptor
- Molecular neuropharmacology
- Neuromuscular transmission
- Neuropsychopharmacology
