= Extracellular matrix =

Structural support for biological cells

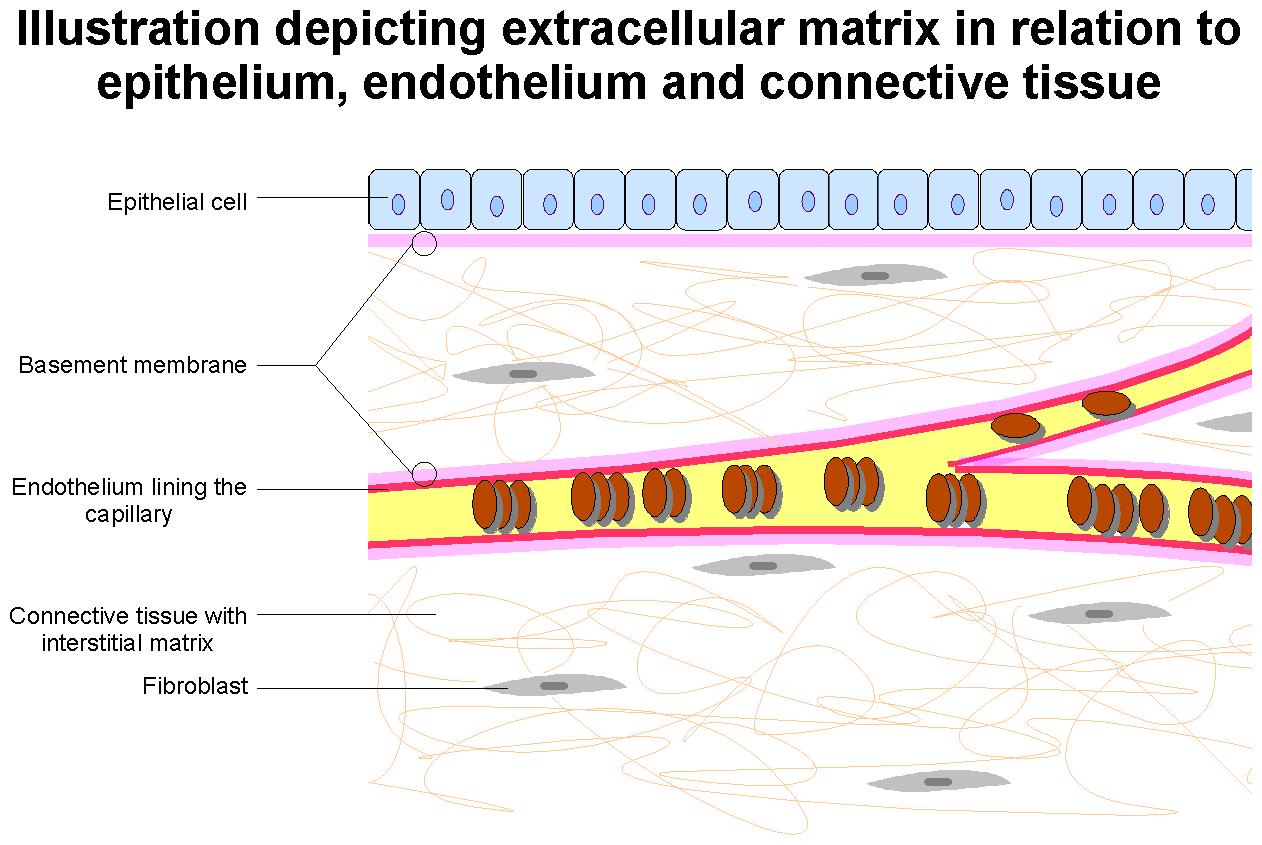
- Illustration depicting extracellular matrix (basement membrane and interstitial matrix) in relation to epithelium, endothelium and connective tissue

Details

Identifiers
- Latin: matrix extracellularis
- Acronym: ECM
- MeSH: D005109
- TH: H2.00.03.0.02001

In biology, the extracellular matrix (ECM), also called the intercellular matrix, is a network consisting of extracellular macromolecules and minerals, such as collagen, enzymes, glycoproteins, glycosaminoglycans, and hydroxyapatite that provide structural and biochemical support to surrounding cells. Because multicellularity evolved independently in different multicellular lineages, the composition of ECM varies between multicellular structures; however, cell adhesion, cell-to-cell communication and differentiation are common functions of the ECM.

The animal extracellular matrix includes the interstitial matrix and the basement membrane. Interstitial matrix is present in the intercellular spaces between various animal cells. Gels of polysaccharides and fibrous proteins fill the interstitial space and act as a compression buffer against the stress placed on the ECM. Basement membranes are sheet-like depositions of ECM on which various epithelial cells rest. Each type of connective tissue in animals has a type of ECM: collagen fibers and bone mineral comprise the ECM of bone tissue; reticular fibers and ground substance comprise the ECM of loose connective tissue; and blood plasma is the ECM of blood.

The plant ECM includes cell wall components, like cellulose, in addition to more complex signaling molecules. Some microorganisms adopt multicellular biofilms in which the cells are embedded in an ECM composed primarily of extracellular polymeric substances.

== Structure ==
1: Microfilaments 2: Phospholipid Bilayer 3: Integrin 4: Proteoglycan 5: Fibronectin 6: Collagen 7: Elastin

Components of the ECM are produced intracellularly by resident cells and secreted into the ECM via exocytosis. Once secreted, they then aggregate with the existing matrix. The ECM is composed of an interlocking mesh of fibrous proteins and glycosaminoglycans (GAGs).

=== Proteoglycans ===
Glycosaminoglycans (GAGs) are carbohydrate polymers and mostly attached to extracellular matrix proteins to form proteoglycans (hyaluronic acid is a notable exception; see below). Proteoglycans have a net negative charge that attracts positively charged sodium ions (Na^{+}), which attracts water molecules via osmosis, keeping the ECM and resident cells hydrated. Proteoglycans may also help to trap and store growth factors within the ECM.

Described below are the different types of proteoglycan found within the extracellular matrix.

==== Heparan sulfate ====
Heparan sulfate (HS) is a linear polysaccharide found in all animal tissues. It occurs as a proteoglycan in which two or three HS chains are attached in close proximity to cell surface or ECM proteins. It is in this form that HS binds to a variety of protein ligands and regulates a wide variety of biological activities, including developmental processes, angiogenesis, blood coagulation, and tumour metastasis.

In the extracellular matrix, especially basement membranes, the multi-domain proteins perlecan, agrin, and collagen XVIII are the main proteins to which heparan sulfate is attached.

==== Chondroitin sulfate ====
Chondroitin sulfates contribute to the tensile strength of cartilage, tendons, ligaments, and walls of the aorta. They have also been known to affect neuroplasticity.

==== Keratan sulfate ====
Keratan sulfates have a variable sulfate content and, unlike many other GAGs, do not contain uronic acid. They are present in the cornea, cartilage, bones, and the horns of animals.

=== Non-proteoglycan polysaccharide ===
==== Hyaluronic acid ====
Hyaluronic acid (or "hyaluronan") is a polysaccharide consisting of alternating residues of D-glucuronic acid and N-acetylglucosamine, and unlike other GAGs, is not found as a proteoglycan. Hyaluronic acid in the extracellular space confers upon tissues the ability to resist compression by providing a counteracting turgor (swelling) force by absorbing significant amounts of water. Hyaluronic acid is thus found in abundance in the ECM of load-bearing joints. It is also a chief component of the interstitial gel. Hyaluronic acid is found on the inner surface of the cell membrane and is translocated out of the cell during biosynthesis.

Hyaluronic acid acts as an environmental cue that regulates cell behavior during embryonic development, healing processes, inflammation, and tumor development. It interacts with a specific transmembrane receptor, CD44.

==== Chitin ====
Chitin, a polymer of N-acetyl glucosamine, is not produced by mammals but is used extensively by various groups of invertebrates. It is an essential part of the shell of molluscs, the cuticle of arthropods, the fibrous ECM of sponges, and the squid beak. Chitin forms into fibers and the fibers are organized into one of three crystalline shapes, α/β/γ. The chitin in arthropods and sponges are mostly in the α shape, organized into sheets (laminae) with the help of β-sheet-rich chitin-binding proteins. The chitin in squid beak is in the β form, organized into a hard composite material with protein coacervates. The cocoon contains γ-chitin. Chitin also makes up the cell wall of fungi.

The stomachs of mammals (including humans) produce chitinase (acidic mammalian chitinase, AMCase), allowing them to break down chitin found in the diet. Despite being digestible, chitin also acts as a dietary fiber in mammals. The production of AMCase requries an immune response to be mounted against chitin.

=== Proteins ===
==== Collagen ====
Collagen is the most abundant protein in the ECM, and is the most abundant protein in the human body. It accounts for 90% of bone matrix protein content. Collagens are present in the ECM as fibrillar proteins and give structural support to resident cells. Collagen is exocytosed in precursor form (procollagen), which is then cleaved by procollagen proteases to allow extracellular assembly. Disorders such as the Collagen VI-Related Dystrophies (Ullrich congenital muscular dystrophy, "intermediate collagen VI-related dystrophy and the Bethlem myopathy), Ehlers–Danlos syndrome, osteogenesis imperfecta, and epidermolysis bullosa are linked with genetic defects in collagen-encoding genes. The collagen can be divided into several families according to the types of structure they form:

1. Fibrillar (Type I, II, III, V, XI)
2. Facit (Type IX, XII, XIV)
3. Short chain (Type VIII, X)
4. Basement membrane (Type IV)
5. Other (Type VI, VII, XIII)

==== Elastin ====
Elastins, in contrast to collagens, give elasticity to tissues, allowing them to stretch when needed and then return to their original state. This is useful in blood vessels, the lungs, in skin, and the ligamentum nuchae, and these tissues contain high amounts of elastins. Elastins are synthesized by fibroblasts and smooth muscle cells. Elastins are highly insoluble, and tropoelastins are secreted inside a chaperone molecule, which releases the precursor molecule upon contact with a fiber of mature elastin. Tropoelastins are then deaminated to become incorporated into the elastin strand. Disorders such as cutis laxa and Williams syndrome are associated with deficient or absent elastin fibers in the ECM.

=== Extracellular vesicles ===
In 2016, Huleihel et al., reported the presence of DNA, RNA, and Matrix-bound nanovesicles (MBVs) within ECM bioscaffolds. MBVs shape and size were found to be consistent with previously described exosomes. MBVs cargo includes different protein molecules, lipids, DNA, fragments, and miRNAs. Similar to ECM bioscaffolds, MBVs can modify the activation state of macrophages and alter different cellular properties such as; proliferation, migration and cell cycle. MBVs are now believed to be an integral and functional key component of ECM bioscaffolds.

== Cell adhesion proteins ==
=== Fibronectin ===
Fibronectins are glycoproteins that connect cells with collagen fibers in the ECM, allowing cells to move through the ECM. Fibronectins bind collagen and cell-surface integrins, causing a reorganization of the cell's cytoskeleton to facilitate cell movement. Fibronectins are secreted by cells in an unfolded, inactive form. Binding to integrins unfolds fibronectin molecules, allowing them to form dimers so that they can function properly. Fibronectins also help at the site of tissue injury by binding to platelets during blood clotting and facilitating cell movement to the affected area during wound healing.

=== Laminin ===
Laminins are proteins found in the basal laminae of virtually all animals. Rather than forming collagen-like fibers, laminins form networks of web-like structures that resist tensile forces in the basal lamina. They also assist in cell adhesion. Laminins bind other ECM components such as collagens and nidogens.

== Development ==
There are many cell types that contribute to the development of the various types of extracellular matrix found in the plethora of tissue types. The local components of ECM determine the properties of the connective tissue.

Fibroblasts are the most common cell type in connective tissue ECM, in which they synthesize, maintain, and provide a structural framework; fibroblasts secrete the precursor components of the ECM, including the ground substance. Chondrocytes are found in cartilage and produce the cartilaginous matrix. Osteoblasts are responsible for bone formation.

== Physiology ==
=== Stiffness and elasticity ===
The ECM can exist in varying degrees of stiffness and elasticity, from soft brain tissues to hard bone tissues. The elasticity of the ECM can differ by several orders of magnitude. This property is primarily dependent on collagen and elastin concentrations, and it has recently been shown to play an influential role in regulating numerous cell functions.

Cells can sense the mechanical properties of their environment by applying forces and measuring the resulting backlash. This plays an important role because it helps regulate many important cellular processes including cellular contraction, cell migration, cell proliferation, differentiation and cell death (apoptosis). Inhibition of nonmuscle myosin II blocks most of these effects, indicating that they are indeed tied to sensing the mechanical properties of the ECM, which has become a new focus in research during the past decade.

==== Effect on gene expression ====
Differing mechanical properties in ECM exert effects on both cell behaviour and gene expression. Although the mechanism by which this is done has not been thoroughly explained, adhesion complexes and the actin-myosin cytoskeleton, whose contractile forces are transmitted through transcellular structures are thought to play key roles in the yet to be discovered molecular pathways.

==== Effect on differentiation ====
ECM elasticity can direct cellular differentiation, the process by which a cell changes from one cell type to another. In particular, naive mesenchymal stem cells (MSCs) have been shown to specify lineage and commit to phenotypes with extreme sensitivity to tissue-level elasticity. MSCs placed on soft matrices that mimic the brain differentiate into neuron-like cells, showing similar shape, RNAi profiles, cytoskeletal markers, and transcription factor levels. Similarly stiffer matrices that mimic muscle are myogenic, and matrices with stiffnesses that mimic collagenous bone are osteogenic.

==== Durotaxis ====
Stiffness and elasticity also guide cell migration, this process is called durotaxis. The term was coined by Lo CM and colleagues when they discovered the tendency of single cells to migrate up rigidity gradients (towards more stiff substrates) and has been extensively studied since. The molecular mechanisms behind durotaxis are thought to exist primarily in the focal adhesion, a large protein complex that acts as the primary site of contact between the cell and the ECM. This complex contains many proteins that are essential to durotaxis including structural anchoring proteins (integrins) and signaling proteins (adhesion kinase (FAK), talin, vinculin, paxillin, α-actinin, GTPases etc.) which cause changes in cell shape and actomyosin contractility. These changes are thought to cause cytoskeletal rearrangements in order to facilitate directional migration.

== Function ==
Due to its diverse nature and composition, the ECM can serve many functions, such as providing support, segregating tissues from one another, and regulating intercellular communication. The extracellular matrix regulates a cell's dynamic behavior. In addition, it sequesters a wide range of cellular growth factors and acts as a local store for them. Changes in physiological conditions can trigger protease activities that cause local release of such stores. This allows the rapid local growth-factor-mediated activation of cellular functions without de novo synthesis.

Formation of the extracellular matrix is essential for processes like growth, wound healing, and fibrosis. An understanding of ECM structure and composition also helps in comprehending the complex dynamics of tumor invasion and metastasis in cancer biology as metastasis often involves the destruction of extracellular matrix by enzymes such as serine proteases, threonine proteases, and matrix metalloproteinases.

The stiffness and elasticity of the ECM has important implications in cell migration, gene expression, and differentiation. Cells actively sense ECM rigidity and migrate preferentially towards stiffer surfaces in a phenomenon called durotaxis. They also detect elasticity and adjust their gene expression accordingly, which has increasingly become a subject of research because of its impact on differentiation and cancer progression. The biochemical and biomechanical properties of tumor ECM differ from those of normal tissues, and could be used for cancer diagnosis and therapy.

In the brain, hyaluronan serves as the primary component of the extracellular matrix, contributing to both structural integrity and signaling functions. High-molecular-weight hyaluronan forms a diffusional barrier that regulates local extracellular diffusion. When the ECM undergoes degradation, hyaluronan fragments are released into the extracellular space, where they act as pro-inflammatory molecules, influencing immune cell responses, including those of microglia.

=== Cell adhesion ===
Many cells bind to components of the extracellular matrix. Cell adhesion can occur in two ways; by focal adhesions, connecting the ECM to actin filaments of the cell, and hemidesmosomes, connecting the ECM to intermediate filaments such as keratin. This cell-to-ECM adhesion is regulated by specific cell-surface cellular adhesion molecules (CAM) known as integrins. Integrins are cell-surface proteins that bind cells to ECM structures, such as fibronectin and laminin, and also to integrin proteins on the surface of other cells.

Fibronectins bind to ECM macromolecules and facilitate their binding to transmembrane integrins. The attachment of fibronectin to the extracellular domain initiates intracellular signalling pathways as well as association with the cellular cytoskeleton via a set of adaptor molecules such as actin.

== Clinical significance ==
Extracellular matrix has been found to cause regrowth and healing of tissue. Although the mechanism of action by which extracellular matrix promotes constructive remodeling of tissue is still unknown, researchers now believe that Matrix-bound nanovesicles (MBVs) are a key player in the healing process. In human fetuses, for example, the extracellular matrix works with stem cells to grow and regrow all parts of the human body, and fetuses can regrow anything that gets damaged in the womb. Scientists have long believed that the matrix stops functioning after full development. It has been used in the past to help horses heal torn ligaments, but it is being researched further as a device for tissue regeneration in humans.

In terms of injury repair and tissue engineering, the extracellular matrix serves two main purposes. First, it prevents the immune system from triggering from the injury and responding with inflammation and scar tissue. Next, it facilitates the surrounding cells to repair the tissue instead of forming scar tissue.

For medical applications, the required ECM is usually extracted from pig bladders, an easily accessible and relatively unused source. It is currently being used regularly to treat ulcers by closing the hole in the tissue that lines the stomach, but further research is currently being done by many universities as well as the U.S. Government for wounded soldier applications. As of early 2007, testing was being carried out on a military base in Texas. Scientists are using a powdered form on Iraq War veterans whose hands were damaged in the war.

Not all ECM devices come from the bladder. Extracellular matrix coming from pig small intestine submucosa are being used to repair "atrial septal defects" (ASD), "patent foramen ovale" (PFO) and inguinal hernia. After one year, 95% of the collagen ECM in these patches has been replaced by the body with the normal soft tissue of the heart.

Extracellular matrix proteins are commonly used in cell culture systems to maintain stem and precursor cells in an undifferentiated state during cell culture and function to induce differentiation of epithelial, endothelial and smooth muscle cells in vitro. Extracellular matrix proteins can also be used to support 3D cell culture in vitro for modelling tumor development.

A class of biomaterials derived from processing human or animal tissues to retain portions of the extracellular matrix are called ECM Biomaterial.

== In plants ==
Plant cells are tessellated to form tissues. The cell wall is the relatively rigid structure surrounding the plant cell. The cell wall provides lateral strength to resist osmotic turgor pressure, but it is flexible enough to allow cell growth when needed; it also serves as a medium for intercellular communication. The cell wall comprises multiple laminate layers of cellulose microfibrils embedded in a matrix of glycoproteins, including hemicellulose, pectin, and extensin. The components of the glycoprotein matrix help cell walls of adjacent plant cells to bind to each other. The selective permeability of the cell wall is chiefly governed by pectins in the glycoprotein matrix. Plasmodesmata (singular: plasmodesma) are pores that traverse the cell walls of adjacent plant cells. These channels are tightly regulated and selectively allow molecules of specific sizes to pass between cells.

== In Pluriformea and Filozoa ==
The extracellular matrix functionality of animals (Metazoa) developed in the common ancestor of the Pluriformea and Filozoa, after the Ichthyosporea diverged.

== History ==
The importance of the extracellular matrix has long been recognized (Lewis, 1922), but the usage of the term is more recent (Gospodarowicz et al., 1979).

== See also ==
- Anoikis
- Interstitium
- Perineuronal net
- Temporal feedback
- Advanced glycation end-product
