= Synthetic Biology Open Language =

Standard for exchange of biological designs

The Synthetic Biology Open Language (SBOL) is a proposed data standard for exchanging synthetic biology designs between software packages. It has been under development by the SBOL Developers Group since 2008. This group aims to develop the standard in a way that is open and democratic in order to include as many interests as possible and to avoid domination by a single company. The group also aims to develop and improve the design standard over time as the field of synthetic biology reflects this development.

A graphical modeling language called SBOL Visual has also been created to visualize SBOL designs.

Synthetic Biology Open Language (SBOL) standard visual symbols: promoter, primer binding site, cds, restriction site, etc.

== Releases ==
| Version | Date |
|---|---|
| 1.0 | November 2011 |
| 1.1 | October 2012 |
| 2.0 | July 2015 |
| 2.1.0 | October 2016 |
| 3.0 | September 2020 |
