= Temporal feedback =

Regulatory mechanism in molecular biology

Within molecular and cell biology, temporal feedback, also referred to as interlinked or interlocked feedback, is a biological regulatory motif in which fast and slow positive feedback loops are interlinked to create "all or none" switches. This interlinking produces separate, adjustable activation and de-activation times. This type of feedback is thought to be important in cellular processes in which an "all or none" decision is a necessary response to a specific input. The mitotic trigger, polarization in budding yeast, mammalian calcium signal transduction, EGF receptor signaling, platelet activation, and Xenopus oocyte maturation are examples for interlinked fast and slow multiple positive feedback systems.

In biological systems, temporal feedback is a ubiquitous signal transduction motif that allows systems to convert graded inputs into decisive, all-or-none digital outputs. A system with interlinked fast and slow feedback loops produces a dual-time switch, which is rapidly inducible and robust to noise during stimulus. In contrast, a single fast or slow loop is separately responsible for the speed of switching and the stability of switches. Computer simulation studies have shown that linking two loops of the same kind brings no overall advantage over having a single loop, however the dual-loop switch performs in a monostable regime. Both single and dual loops can behave as a bistable switch. Several computational models have been produced to demonstrate the responses of single and dual positive feedback loop switches to stimuli.

== Biological examples ==
The transcription factor NF-κB regulates various genes that play essential roles in signaling, stress responses, cell growth and apoptosis. The temporal control of NF-κB activation by the degradation and synthesis of its inhibitor isoforms, I-κBα, -β, - ε has been computationally modeled. The model suggested that I-κBα results in robust negative feedback that leads to a fast turn off of NF-κB response. On the other hand, the oscillatory potential and stabilization of NF-κB during long stimulations has been shown to be reduced by I-κBβ and –ε.

The outgrowth and progression is of limb organogenesis is controlled by self-regulatory, robust signalling system that involves interlinked feedback mechanisms instead of independent morphogen signals. The studies on morphogenesis of limb buds have been focused on one particular axis of limb bud. However it has long been noted that zone of polarizing activity (ZPA) requires maintenance of apical ectodermal ridge (AER). The dependence of ZPA on ARE indicates the linkage between them. Three phases have been observed during the interplay between ARE and ZPA. Initiation phase involves the Grem1 expression in a fast initiator loop (~2h loop time) due to upregulation by BMP4. The Shh signalling is activated independently of GREM1 and AER-FGFs. Propagation phase involves the control of distal progression during limb bud development. Finally termination of signalling system due to the widening gap between ZPA-SHH signalling and the Grem1 expression domain. In mouse limb patterning, limb development is regulated by linking a fast GREM1 module to the slower SSH/FGF epithelial-mesenchymal feedback loop.

Circadian rhythms, which regulate physiology and behavior in organisms, are dependent upon a system of interlinked feedback mechanisms as well. In mammals, this process is driven by the suprachiasmatic nuclei (SCN) in the hypothalamus, composed of the two negative feedback loops Per-Cry and Clock-Bmal. Transcription of the period (Per) and cryptochrome (Cry) genes cannot proceed until CLOCK and BMAL1 have dimerized and bound to the E-box element, a process initiated by CREB-binding protein (CPB). Once bound to the E-box elements of per and cry, successful production of mRNA transcripts occurs and the proteins PER and CRY are synthesized. PER and CRY then dimerize and repress the transcription of the gene Rev-Erb, the protein product of which, REV-ERB, represses transcription of Bmal. The repression of BMAL in vivo prevents the transactivation of Per-Cry, thereby completing the cycle in just over 24 hours.
