= Exocytosis =

Active transport and bulk transport in which a cell transports molecules out of the cell

Exocytosis of neurotransmitters into a synapse from neuron A to neuron B.: 1. Mitochondrion; 2. Synaptic vesicle with neurotransmitters; 3. Autoreceptor; 4. Synapse with neurotransmitter released (serotonin); 5. Postsynaptic receptors activated by neurotransmitter (induction of a postsynaptic potential); 6. Calcium channel; 7. Exocytosis of a vesicle; 8. Recaptured neurotransmitter

Exocytosis (/ˌɛksoʊsaɪˈtoʊsɪs/) is a form of active transport in which a cell transports molecules (e.g., neurotransmitters and proteins) out of the cell. As an active transport mechanism, exocytosis requires the use of energy to transport material. Exocytosis and its counterpart, endocytosis, are used by all cells because most chemical substances important to them are large polar molecules that cannot pass through the hydrophobic portion of the cell membrane by passive means. Exocytosis is the process by which a large amount of molecules are released; thus it is a form of bulk transport. Exocytosis occurs via secretory portals at the cell plasma membrane called porosomes. Porosomes are permanent cup-shaped lipoprotein structures at the cell plasma membrane, where secretory vesicles transiently dock and fuse to release intra-vesicular contents from the cell.

In exocytosis, membrane-bound secretory vesicles are carried to the cell membrane, where they dock and fuse at porosomes and their contents (i.e., water-soluble molecules) are secreted into the extracellular environment. This secretion is possible because the vesicle transiently fuses with the plasma membrane. In the context of neurotransmission, neurotransmitters are typically released from synaptic vesicles into the synaptic cleft via exocytosis; however, neurotransmitters can also be released via reverse transport through membrane transport proteins.

Exocytosis is also a mechanism by which cells are able to insert membrane proteins (such as ion channels and cell surface receptors), lipids, and other components into the cell membrane. Vesicles containing these membrane components fully fuse with and become part of the outer cell membrane.

== History ==
The term was proposed by De Duve in 1963.

== Types ==
In eukaryotes, there are two types of exocytosis: 1) Ca^{2+} triggered non-constitutive (i.e., regulated exocytosis) and 2) non-Ca^{2+} triggered constitutive (i.e., non-regulated).

Ca^{2+} triggered non-constitutive exocytosis requires an external signal, a specific sorting signal on the vesicles, a clathrin coat, as well as an increase in intracellular calcium. In multicellular organisms, this mechanism initiates many forms of intercellular communication such as synaptic transmission, hormone secretion by neuroendocrine cells, and immune cells' secretion. In neurons and endocrine cells, the SNARE proteins and SM-proteins catalyze the fusion by forming a complex that brings the two fusion membranes together. For instance, in synapses, the SNARE complex is formed by syntaxin-1 and SNAP25 at the plasma membrane and VAMP2 at the vesicle membrane. Exocytosis in neuronal chemical synapses is Ca^{2+} triggered and serves interneuronal signalling. The calcium sensors that trigger exocytosis might interact either with the SNARE complex or with the phospholipids of the fusing membranes. Synaptotagmin has been recognized as the major sensor for Ca^{2+} triggered exocytosis in animals. However, synaptotagmin proteins are absent in plants and unicellular eukaryotes. Other potential calcium sensors for exocytosis are EF-hand proteins (e.g., Calmodulin) and C2 domain (e.g., Ferlins, E-synaptotagmin, Doc2b) containing proteins. It is unclear how the different calcium sensors can cooperate to mediate the calcium-triggered kinetics of exocytosis in a specific fashion.

Constitutive exocytosis is performed by all cells and serves the release of components of the extracellular matrix or delivery of newly synthesized membrane proteins that are incorporated in the plasma membrane after the fusion of the transport vesicle. There is no clear consensus about the machinery and molecular processes that drive the formation, budding, translocation and fusion of the post-Golgi vesicles to the plasma membrane. The fusion involves membrane tethering (recognition) and membrane fusion. It is still unclear if the machinery between the constitutive and regulated secretion is different. The machinery required for constitutive exocytosis has not been studied as much as the mechanism of regulated exocytosis. Two tethering complexes are associated with constitutive exocytosis in mammals, ELKS and Exocyst. ELKS is a large coiled-coil protein, also involved in synaptic exocytosis, marking the 'hotspots' fusion points of the secretory carriers fusion. Exocyst is an octameric protein complex. In mammals, exocyst components localize in both plasma membrane, and Golgi apparatus and the exocyst proteins are colocalized at the fusion point of the post-Golgi vesicles. The membrane fusion of the constitutive exocytosis, probably, is mediated by SNAP29 and Syntaxin19 at the plasma membrane and YKT6 or VAMP3 at the vesicle membrane.

Vesicular exocytosis in prokaryote gram negative bacteria is a third mechanism and latest finding in exocytosis. The periplasm is pinched off as bacterial outer membrane vesicles (OMVs) for translocating microbial biochemical signals into eukaryotic host cells or other microbes located nearby, accomplishing control of the secreting microbe on its environment - including invasion of host, endotoxemia, competing with other microbes for nutrition, etc. This finding of membrane vesicle trafficking occurring at the host–pathogen interface is an evidence that exocytosis is not limited to eukaryotic cells.

== Steps ==
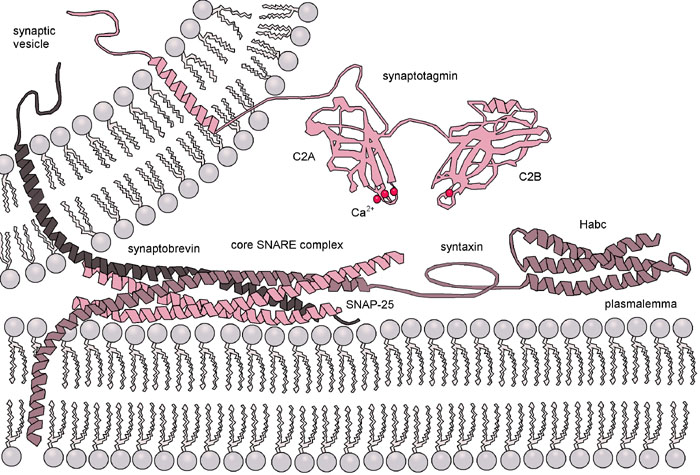
Molecular machinery driving exocytosis in neuromediator release. The core SNARE complex is formed by four α-helices contributed by synaptobrevin, syntaxin and SNAP-25, synaptotagmin serves as a calcium sensor and regulates intimately the SNARE zipping.

Five steps are involved in exocytosis:

=== Vesicle trafficking ===
Certain vesicle-trafficking steps require the transportation of a vesicle over a moderately small distance. For example, vesicles that transport proteins from the Golgi apparatus to the cell surface area, will be likely to use motor proteins and a cytoskeletal track to get closer to their target. Before tethering would have been appropriate, many of the proteins used for the active transport would have been instead set for passive transport, because the Golgi apparatus does not require ATP to transport proteins. Both the actin- and the microtubule-base are implicated in these processes, along with several motor proteins. Once the vesicles reach their targets, they come into contact with tethering factors that can restrain them.

=== Vesicle tethering ===
It is useful to distinguish between the initial, loose tethering of vesicles to their objective from the more stable, packing interactions. Tethering involves links over distances of more than about half the diameter of a vesicle from a given membrane surface (>25 nm). Tethering interactions are likely to be involved in concentrating synaptic vesicles at the synapse.

=== Vesicle docking ===
Secretory vesicles transiently dock and fuse at the porosome at the cell plasma membrane, via a tight t-/v-SNARE ring complex.

=== Vesicle priming ===
In neuronal exocytosis, the term priming has been used to include all of the molecular rearrangements and ATP-dependent protein and lipid modifications that take place after initial docking of a synaptic vesicle but before exocytosis, such that the influx of calcium ions is all that is needed to trigger nearly instantaneous neurotransmitter release. In other cell types, whose secretion is constitutive (i.e. continuous, calcium ion independent, non-triggered) there is no priming.

=== Vesicle fusion ===
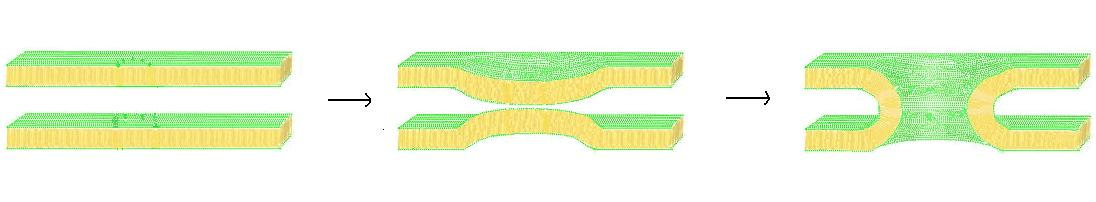
In the lipid-lined pore theory, both membranes curve toward each other to form the early fusion pore. When the two membranes are brought to a "critical" distance, the lipid head-groups from one membrane insert into the other, creating the basis for the fusion pore.

Transient vesicle fusion is driven by SNARE proteins, resulting in release of vesicle contents into the extracellular space (or in case of neurons in the synaptic cleft).

The merging of the donor and the acceptor membranes accomplishes three tasks:

- The surface of the plasma membrane increases (by the surface of the fused vesicle). This is important for the regulation of cell size, e.g., during cell growth.
- The substances within the vesicle are released into the exterior. These might be waste products or toxins, or signaling molecules like hormones or neurotransmitters during synaptic transmission.
- Proteins embedded in the vesicle membrane are now part of the plasma membrane. The side of the protein that was facing the inside of the vesicle now faces the outside of the cell. This mechanism is important for the regulation of transmembrane and transporters.

== Vesicle retrieval ==
Retrieval of synaptic vesicles occurs by endocytosis. Most synaptic vesicles are recycled without a full fusion into the membrane (kiss-and-run fusion) via porosome. Non-constitutive exocytosis and subsequent endocytosis are highly energy expending processes, and thus, are dependent on mitochondria.

Examination of cells following secretion using electron microscopy demonstrate increased presence of partially empty vesicles following secretion. This suggested that during the secretory process, only a portion of the vesicular content is able to exit the cell. This could only be possible if the vesicle were to temporarily establish continuity with the cell plasma membrane at porosomes, expel a portion of its contents, then detach, reseal, and withdraw into the cytosol (endocytose). In this way, the secretory vesicle could be reused for subsequent rounds of exo-endocytosis, until completely empty of its contents.

== See also ==
- Endocytosis
- Pinocytosis
- Phagocytosis
- Membrane nanotube
- Viral shedding
- Presynaptic active zone
- Residual body
- Degranulation
