= Porosome =

Structure in eukaryotic cell membrane

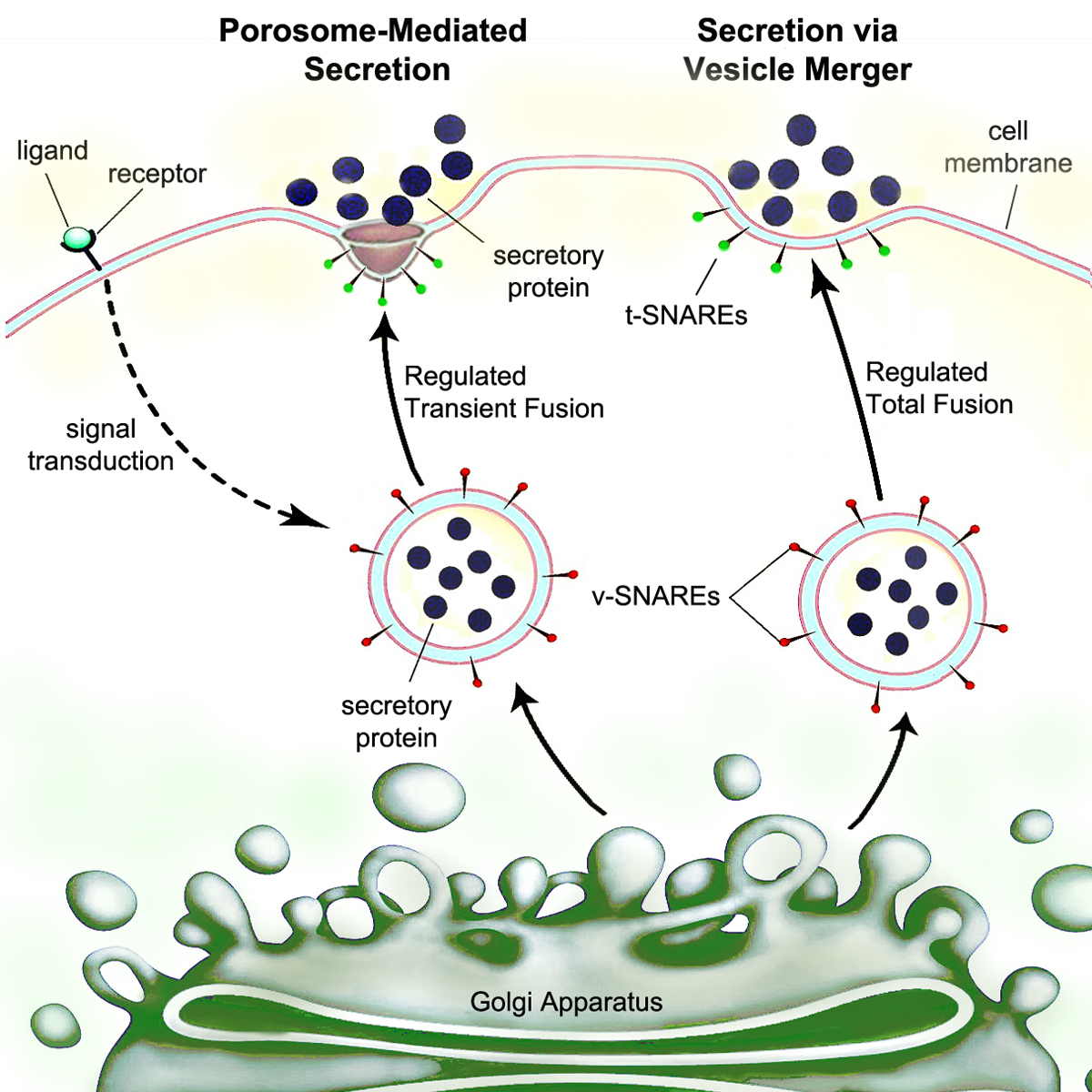

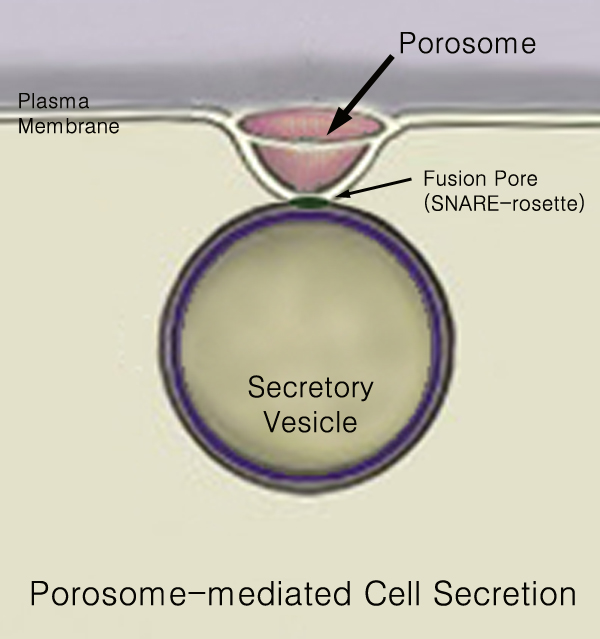

Porosomes are cup-shaped supramolecular structures in the cell membranes of eukaryotic cells where secretory vesicles transiently dock in the process of vesicle fusion and secretion. The transient fusion of secretory vesicle membrane at a porosome, base via SNARE proteins, results in the formation of a fusion pore or continuity for the release of intravesicular contents from the cell. After secretion is complete, the fusion pore temporarily formed at the base of the porosome is sealed. Porosomes are few nanometers in size and contain many different types of protein, especially chloride and calcium channels, actin, and SNARE proteins that mediate the docking and fusion of the vesicles with the cell membrane. Once the vesicles have docked with the SNARE proteins, they swell, which increases their internal pressure. They then transiently fuse at the base of the porosome, and these pressurized contents are ejected from the cell. Examination of cells following secretion using electron microscopy, demonstrate increased presence of partially empty vesicles following secretion. This suggested that during the secretory process, only a portion of the vesicular contents are able to exit the cell. This could only be possible if the vesicle were to temporarily establish continuity with the cell plasma membrane, expel a portion of its contents, then detach, reseal, and withdraw into the cytosol (endocytose). In this way, the secretory vesicle could be reused for subsequent rounds of exo-endocytosis, until completely empty of its contents.

Porosomes vary in size depending on the cell type. Porosome in the exocrine pancreas and in endocrine and neuroendocrine cells range from 100 nm to 180 nm in diameter while in neurons they range from 10 nm to 15 nm (about 1/10 the size of pancreatic porosomes). When a secretory vesicle containing v-SNARE docks at the porosome base containing t-SNARE, membrane continuity (ring complex) is formed between the two. The size of the t/v-SNARE complex is directly proportional to the size of the vesicle. These vesicles contain dehydrated proteins (non-active) which are activated once they are hydrated. GTP is required for the transport of water through the water channels or Aquaporins, and ions through ion channels to hydrate the vesicle. Once the vesicle fuses at the porosome base, the contents of the vesicle at high pressure are ejected from the cell.

Generally, the porosomes are opened and closed by actin, however, neurons require a fast response therefore they have central plugs that open to release contents and close to stop the release (the composition of the central plug is yet to be discovered). Porosomes have been demonstrated to be the universal secretory machinery in cells. The neuronal porosome proteome has been solved, providing the possible molecular architecture and the complete composition of the machinery.

== History of discovery ==
The porosome was discovered in the early to mid-1990s by a team led by Professor Bhanu Pratap Jena at Yale University School of Medicine, using atomic force microscopy.
