= Protein acetylation =

Protein acetylation (and deacetylation) are acetylation reactions that occur within living cells as drug metabolism, by enzymes in the liver and other organs (e. g., the brain). Pharmaceuticals frequently employ acetylation to enable such esters to cross the blood–brain barrier (and placenta), where they are deacetylated by enzymes (carboxylesterases) in a manner similar to acetylcholine. Examples of acetylated pharmaceuticals are diacetylmorphine (heroin), acetylsalicylic acid (aspirin), THC-O-acetate, and diacerein. Conversely, drugs such as isoniazid are acetylated within the liver during drug metabolism. A drug that depends on such metabolic transformations in order to act is termed a prodrug.

Acetylation is an important modification of proteins in cell biology; and proteomics studies have identified thousands of acetylated mammalian proteins. Acetylation occurs as a co-translational and post-translational modification of proteins, for example, histones, p53, and tubulins. Among these proteins, chromatin proteins and metabolic enzymes are highly represented, indicating that acetylation has a considerable impact on gene expression and metabolism. In bacteria, 90% of proteins involved in central metabolism of Salmonella enterica are acetylated.

== N-terminal acetylation ==
N-terminal acetylation by N-terminal acetyltransferases (NATs).

N-terminal acetylation is one of the most common co-translational covalent modifications of proteins in eukaryotes, and it is crucial for the regulation and function of different proteins. N-terminal acetylation plays an important role in the synthesis, stability and localization of proteins. About 85% of all human proteins and 68% in yeast are acetylated at their Nα-terminus. Several proteins from prokaryotes and archaea are also modified by N-terminal acetylation.

N-terminal Acetylation is catalyzed by a set of enzyme complexes, the N-terminal acetyltransferases (NATs). NATs transfer an acetyl group from acetyl-coenzyme A (Ac-CoA) to the α-amino group of the first amino acid residue of the protein. Different NATs are responsible for the acetylation of nascent protein N-terminal, and the acetylation was found to be irreversible so far.

=== N-terminal acetyltransferases ===
To date, seven different NATs have been found in humans - NatA, NatB, NatC, NatD, NatE, NatF and NatH. Each of these different enzyme complexes is specific for different amino acids or amino acid sequences which is shown in the following table.

Table 1. The Composition and Substrate specificity of NATs.

NAT	Subunits (catalytic subunits are in bold.)	Substrates
NatA	**Naa10** (Ard1) Naa15 (Nat1)	Ser-, Ala-, Gly-, Thr-, Val-, Cys- N-termini
NatB	**Naa20** (Nat3) Naa25 (Mdm20)	Met-Glu-, Met-Asp-, Met-Asn-, Met-Gln- N-termini
NatC	**Naa30** (Mak3) Naa35 (Mak10) Naa38 (Mak31)	Met-Leu-, Met-Ile-, Met-Trp-, Met-Phe- N-termini
NatD	**Naa40** (Nat4)	Ser-Gly-Gly-, Ser-Gly-Arg- N-termini
NatE	**Naa50** (Nat5) Naa10 (Ard1) Naa15 (Nat1)	Met-Leu-, Met-Ala-, Met-Lys-, Met-Met- N-termini
NatF	**Naa60**	Met-Lys-, Met-Leu-, Met-Ile-, Met-Trp-, Met-Phe- N-termini
NatH	**Naa80**	Actin- N-termini

==== NatA ====
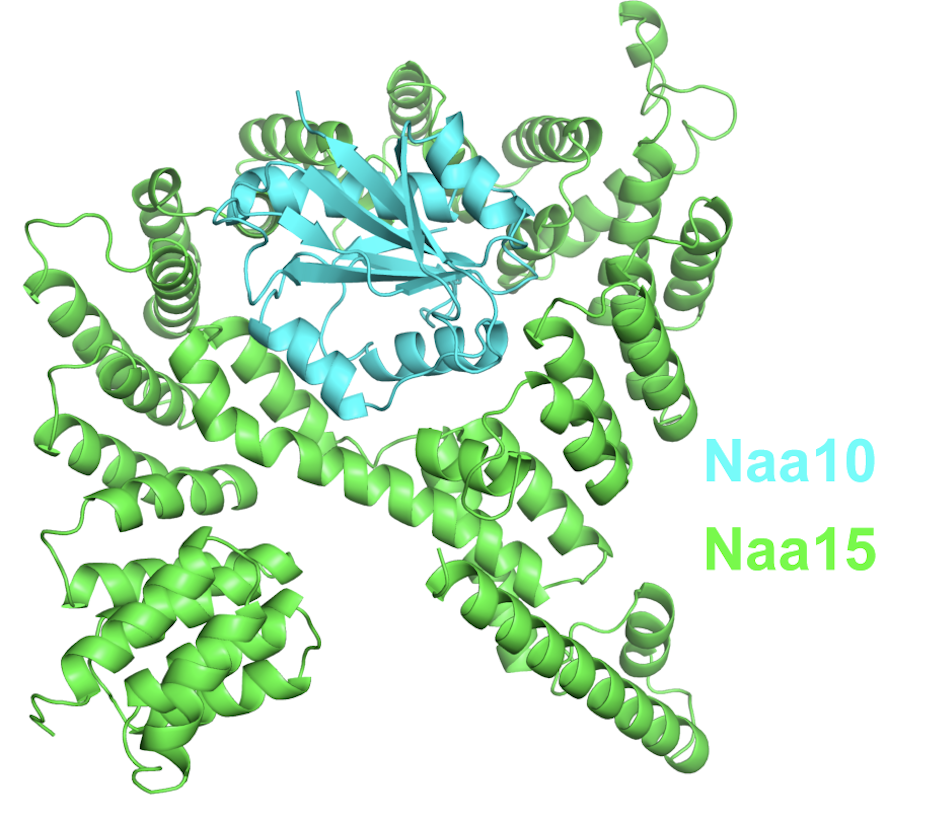
Crystal structure of the NatA complex (Naa10 and Naa15) from Schizosaccharomyces pombe. The green chains represent the auxiliary subunit Naa15 and the cyan chains the catalytic subunit Naa10. (PDB ID: 4KVM)

NatA is composed of two subunits, the catalytic subunit Naa10 and the auxiliary subunit Naa15. NatA subunits are more complex in higher eukaryotes than in lower eukaryotes. In addition to the genes NAA10 and NAA15, the mammal-specific genes NAA11 and NAA16, make functional gene products, which form different active NatA complexes. Four possible hNatA catalytic-auxiliary dimers are formed by these four proteins. However, Naa10/Naa15 is the most abundant NatA.

NatA acetylates Ser, Ala-, Gly-, Thr-, Val- and Cys N-termini after the initiator methionine is removed by methionine amino-peptidases. These amino acids are more frequently expressed in the N-terminal of proteins in eukaryotes, so NatA is the major NAT corresponding to the whole number of its potential substrates.

Several different interaction partners are involved in the N-terminal acetylation by NatA. Huntingtin interacting protein K (HYPK) interacts with hNatA on the ribosome to affect the N-terminal acetylation of a subset of NatA substrates. Subunits hNaa10 and hNaa15 will increase the tendency for aggregation of Huntingtin if HYPK is depleted. Hypoxia-inducible factor (HIF)-1α has also been found to interact with hNaa10 to inhibit hNaa10-mediated activation of β-catenin transcriptional activity.

==== NatB ====
NatB complexes are composed of the catalytic subunit Naa20p and the auxiliary subunit Naa25p, which are both found in yeast and humans. In yeast, all the NatB subunits are ribosome-associated; but in humans, NatB subunits are both found to be ribosome-associated and non-ribosomal form. NatB acetylates the N-terminal methionine of substrates starting with Met-Glu-, Met-Asp-, Met-Asn- or Met-Gln- N termini.

==== NatC ====
NatC complex consists of one catalytic subunit Naa30p and two auxiliary subunits Naa35p and Naa38p. All three subunits are found on the ribosome in yeast, but they are also found in non-ribosomal NAT forms like Nat2. NatC complex acetylates the N-terminal methionine of substrates Met-Leu-, Met-Ile-, Met-Trp- or Met-Phe N-termini.

==== NatD ====
NatD is only composed with the catalytic unit Naa40p and Naa40p and it is conceptually different form the other NATs. At first, only two substrates, H2A and H4 have been identified in yeast and humans. Secondly, the substrate specificity of Naa40p lies within the first 30-50 residues which are quite larger than the substrate specificity of other NATs. The acetylation of histones by NatD is partially associate with ribosomes and the amino acids substrates are the very N-terminal residues, which makes it different from lysine N-acetyltransferases (KATs).

==== NatE ====
NatE complex consists with subunit Naa50p and two NatA subunits, Naa10p and Naa15p. The N terminus of Naa50p substrates is different from those acetylated by the NatA activity of Naa10p. NAA50 in plants is essential to control plant growth, development, and stress responses and NAA50 function is highly conserved between humans and plants.

==== NatF ====
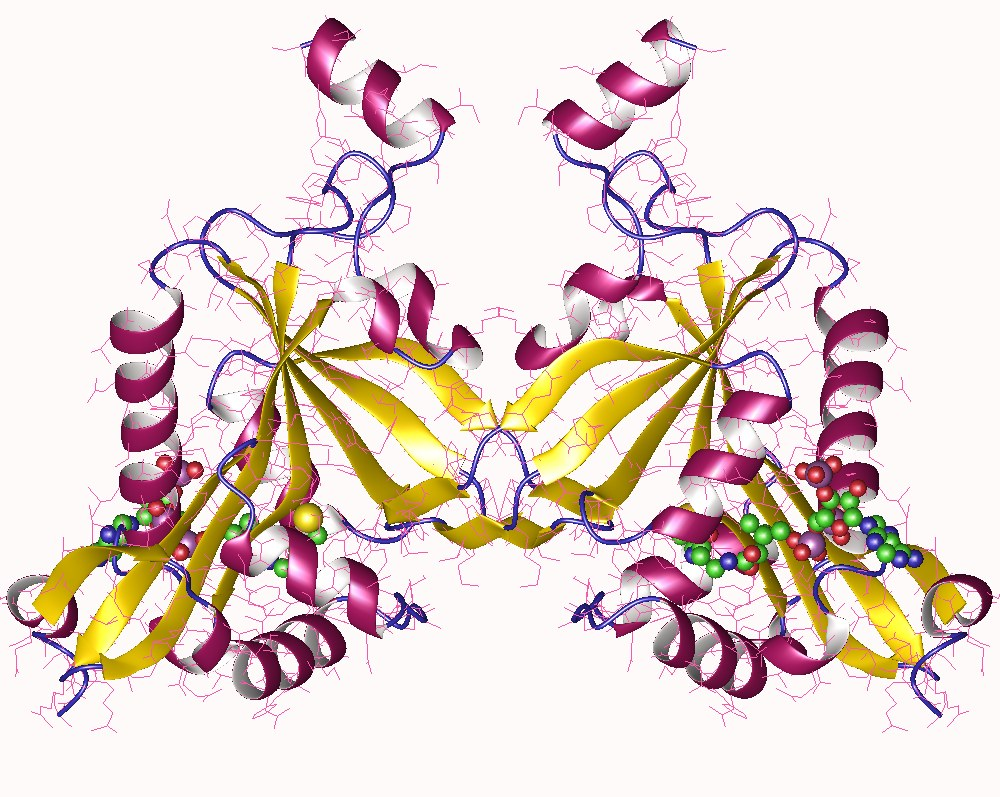
NatF dimer, Human

NatF is a NAT that is composed of the Naa60 enzyme. Initially, it was thought that NatF was only found in higher eukaryotes, since it was absent from yeast. However, it was later found that Naa60 is found throughout the eukaryotic domain, but was secondarily lost in the fungi lineage. Compared to yeast, NatF contributes to the higher abundance of N-terminal acetylation in humans. NatF complex acetylates the N-terminal methionine of substrates Met-Lys-, Met-Leu-, Met-Ile-, Met-Trp- and Met-Phe N termini which are partly overlapping with NatC and NatE. NatF has been shown to have an organellar localization and acetylates cytosolic N-termini of transmembrane proteins. The organellar localization of Naa60 is mediated by its unique C-terminus, which consists of two alpha helices that peripherally associate with the membrane and mediate interactions with PI(4)P.

==== NAA80/NatH ====
NAA80/NatH is an N-terminal acetyltransferase that specifically acetylates the N-terminus of actin.

=== N-terminal acetylation function ===
==== Protein stability ====
N-terminal acetylation of proteins can affect protein stability, but the results and mechanism were not very clear until now. It was believed that N-terminal acetylation protects proteins from being degraded as Nα-acetylation N-termini were supposed to block N-terminal ubiquitination and subsequent protein degradation. However, several studies have shown that the N-terminal acetylated protein have a similar degradation rate as proteins with a non-blocked N-terminus.

==== Protein localization ====
N-terminal acetylation has been shown that it can steer the localization of proteins. Arl3p is one of the 'Arf-like' (Arl) GTPases, which is crucial for the organization of membrane traffic. It requires its Nα-acetyl group for its targeting to the Golgi membrane by the interaction with Golgi membrane-residing protein Sys1p. If the Phe or Tyr is replaced by an Ala at the N-terminal of Arl3p, it can no longer localized to the Golgi membrane, indicating that Arl3p needs its natural N-terminal residues which could be acetylated for proper localization.

==== Metabolism and apoptosis ====
Protein N-terminal acetylation has also been proved to relate with cell cycle regulation and apoptosis with protein knockdown experiments. Knockdown of the NatA or the NatC complex leads to the induction of p53-dependent apoptosis, which may indicate that the anti-apoptotic proteins were less or no longer functional because of reduced protein N-terminal acetylation. But in contrast, the caspase-2, which is acetylated by NatA, can interact with the adaptor protein RIP associated Ich-1/Ced-3 homologous protein with a death domain (RAIDD). This could activate caspase-2 and induce cell apoptosis.

==== Protein synthesis ====
Ribosome proteins play an important role in the protein synthesis, which could also be N-terminal acetylated. The N-terminal acetylation of the ribosome proteins may have an effect on protein synthesis. A decrease of 27% and 23% in the protein synthesis rate was observed with NatA and NatB deletion strains. A reduction of translation fidelity was observed in the NatA deletion strain and a defect in ribosome was noticed in the NatB deletion strain.

=== Cancer ===
NATs have been suggested to act as both onco-proteins and tumor suppressors in human cancers, and NAT expression may be increased and decreased in cancer cells. Ectopic expression of hNaa10p increased cell proliferation and up regulation of gene involved in cell survival proliferation and metabolism. Overexpression of hNaa10p was in the urinary bladder cancer, breast cancer and cervical carcinoma. But a high level expression of hNaa10p could also suppress tumor growth and a reduced level of expressed hNaa10p is associated with a poor prognosis, large tumors and more lymph node metastases.

Table 2. Overview of the expression of NatA subunits in various cancer tissues

Nat subunits	Cancer tissue	Expression pattern
hNaa10	lung cancer, breast cancer, colorectal cancer, hepatocellular carcinoma	high in tumors
hNaa10	lung cancer, breast cancer, pancreatic cancer, ovarian cancer	loss of heterozygosity in tumors
hNaa10	breast cancer, gastric cancer, lung cancer	high in primary tumors, but low with lymph node metastases
hNaa10	Non-small cell lung cancer	low in tumors
hNaa15	papillary thyroid carcinoma, gastric cancer	high in tumors
hNaa15	neuroblastoma	high in advanced stage tumors
hNaa11	hepatocellular carcinoma	loss of heterozygosity in tumors

== Lysine acetylation and deacetylation ==
Lysine acetylation

Proteins are typically acetylated on lysine residues and this reaction relies on acetyl-coenzyme A as the acetyl group donor. In histone acetylation and deacetylation, histone proteins are acetylated and deacetylated on lysine residues in the N-terminal tail as part of gene regulation. Typically, these reactions are catalyzed by enzymes with histone acetyltransferase (HAT) or histone deacetylase (HDAC) activity, although HATs and HDACs can modify the acetylation status of non-histone proteins as well.

The regulation of transcription factors, effector proteins, molecular chaperones, and cytoskeletal proteins by acetylation and deacetylation is a significant post-translational regulatory mechanism These regulatory mechanisms are analogous to phosphorylation and dephosphorylation by the action of kinases and phosphatases. Not only can the acetylation state of a protein modify its activity but there has been recent suggestion that this post-translational modification may also crosstalk with phosphorylation, methylation, ubiquitination, sumoylation, and others for dynamic control of cellular signaling. The regulation of tubulin protein is an example of this in mouse neurons and astroglia. A tubulin acetyltransferase is located in the axoneme, and acetylates the α-tubulin subunit in an assembled microtubule. Once disassembled, this acetylation is removed by another specific deacetylase in the cell cytosol. Thus axonemal microtubules, which have a long half-life, carry a "signature acetylation," which is absent from cytosolic microtubules that have a shorter half-life.

In the field of epigenetics, histone acetylation (and deacetylation) have been shown to be important mechanisms in the regulation of gene transcription. Histones, however, are not the only proteins regulated by posttranslational acetylation. The following are examples of various other proteins with roles in regulating signal transduction, whose activities are also affected by acetylation and deacetylation.

=== p53 ===
The p53 protein is a tumor suppressor that plays an important role in the signal transactions in cells, especially in maintaining the stability of the genome by preventing mutation. Therefore, it is also known as "the guardian of the genome". It also regulates the cell cycle and arrests cell growth by activating a regulator of the cell cycle, p21. Under severe DNA damage, it also initiates programmed cell death.The function of p53 is negatively regulated by oncoprotein Mdm2. Studies suggested that Mdm2 will form a complex with p53 and prevent it from binding to specific p53-responsive genes.

==== Acetylation of p53 ====
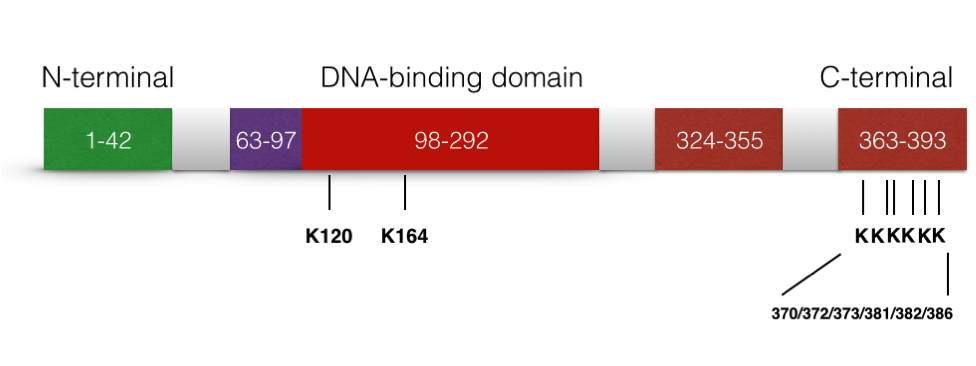
p53 acetylation site

The acetylation of p53 is indispensable for its activation. It has been reported that the acetylation level of p53 will increase significantly when the cell undergoes stress. Acetylation sites have been observed on the DNA binding domain (K164 and K120) and the C terminus. Acetylation sites demonstrate significant redundancy: if only one acetylation site is inactivated by mutation to arginine, the expression of p21 is still observed. However, if multiple acetylation sites are blocked, the expression of p21 and the suppression of cell growth caused by p53 is completely lost. In addition, the acetylation of p53 prevents its binding to the repressor Mdm2 on DNA. In addition, it is suggested that the p53 acetylation is crucial for its transcription-independent proapoptotic functions. An acetylation site of the C-terminus was investigated by molecular dynamics simulations and circular dichroism spectroscopy, and it was suggested that the acetylation changes the structural ensemble of the C-terminus.

==== Implications for cancer therapy ====
Since the major function of p53 is tumor suppressor, the idea that activation of p53 is an appealing strategy for cancer treatment. Nutlin-3 is a small molecule designed to target p53 and Mdm2 interaction that kept p53 from deactivation. Reports also shown that the cancer cell under the Nutilin-3a treatment, acetylation of lys 382 was observed in the c-terminal of p53.

=== Microtubule ===
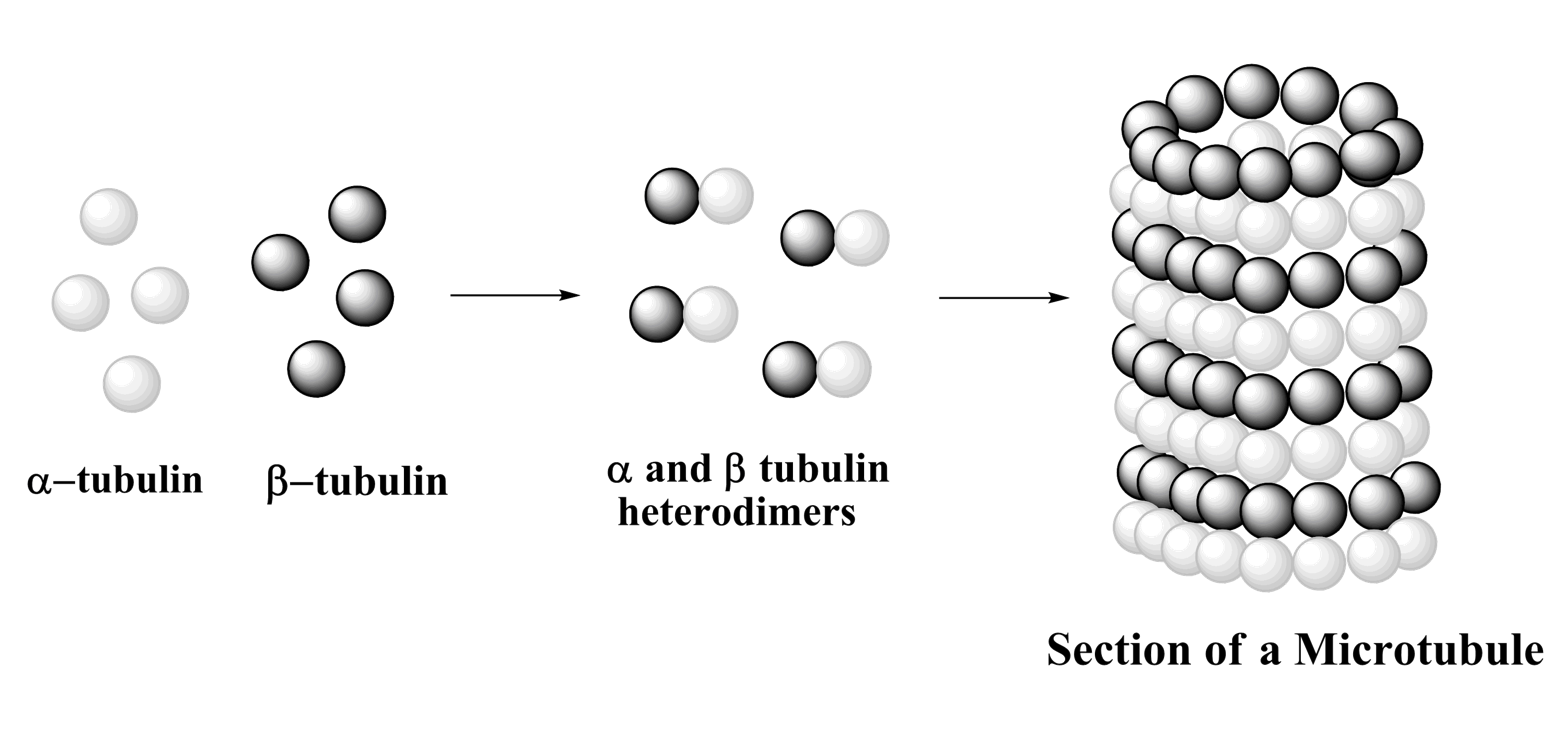
Formation of Microtubule

The structure of microtubules is long, hollow cylinder dynamically assembled from α/β-tubulin dimers. They play an essential role in maintaining the structure of the cell as well as cell processes, for example, movement of organelles. In addition, microtubule is responsible of forming mitotic spindle in eukaryotic cells to transport chromosomes in cell division.

==== Acetylation of tubulin ====
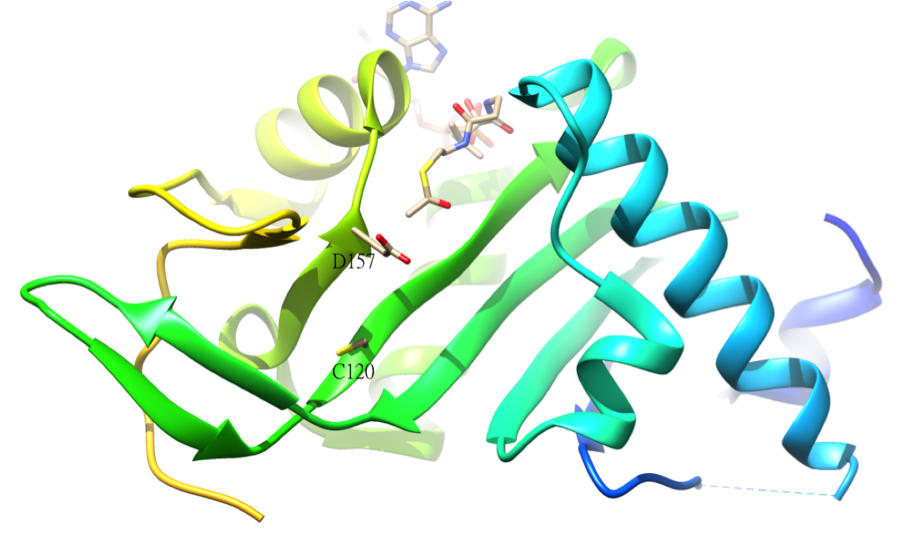
Acetylation tubulin

The acetylated residue of α-tubulin is K40, which is catalyzed by α-tubulin acetyl-transferase (α-TAT) in human. The acetylation of K40 on α-tubulin is a hallmark of stable microtubules. The active site residues D157 and C120 of α-TAT1 are responsible for the catalysis because of the shape complementary to α-Tubulin. In addition, some unique structural features such as β4-β5 hairpin, C-terminal loop, and α1-α2 loop regions are important for specific α-Tubulin molecular recognition. The reverse reaction of the acetylation is catalyzed by histone deacetylase 6.

==== Implications for cancer therapy ====
Since microtubules play an important role in cell division, especially in the G2/M phase of the cell cycle, attempts have been made to impede microtubule function using small molecule inhibitors, which have been successfully used in clinics as cancer therapies. For example, the vinca alkaloids and taxanes selectively bind and inhibit microtubules, leading to cell cycle arrest. The identification of the crystal structure of acetylation of α-tubulin acetyl-transferase (α-TAT) also sheds a light on the discovery of small molecule that could modulate the stability or de-polymerization of tubulin. In other words, by targeting α-TAT, it is possible to prevent the tubulin from acetylation and result in the destabilization of tubulin, which is a similar mechanism for tubulin destabilizing agents.

=== STAT3 ===
Signal transducer and activator of transcription 3 (STAT3) is a transcription factor that is phosphorylated by receptor associated kinases, for example, Janus-family tyrosine kinases, and translocate to nucleus. STAT3 regulates several genes in response to growth factors and cytokines and play an important role in cell growth. Therefore, STAT3 facilitates oncogenesis in a variety of cell growth related pathways. On the other hand, it also play a role in the tumor suppressor.

==== Acetylation of STAT3 ====
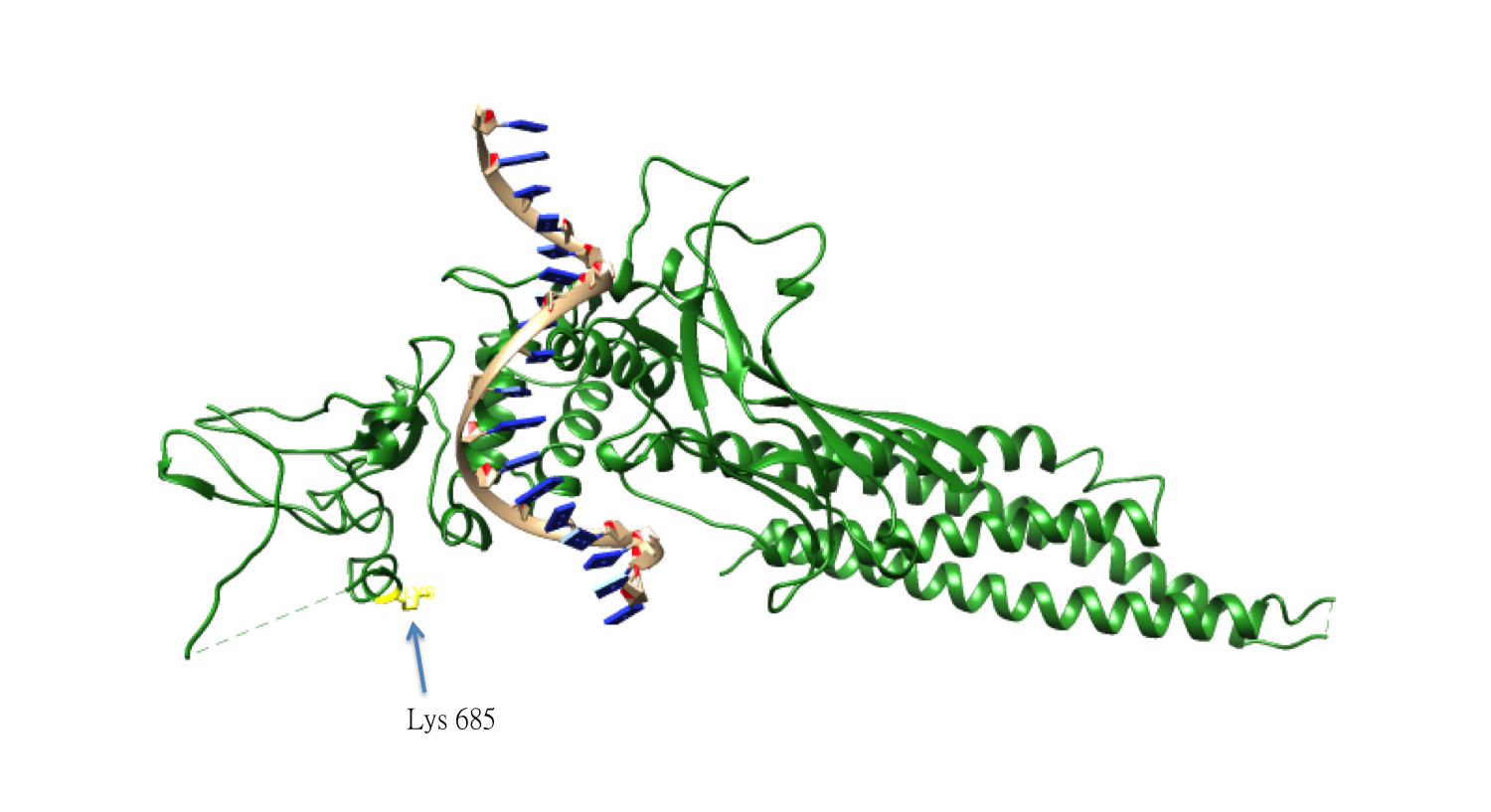
Structure and acetylation residue of STAT3

The acetylation of Lys685 of STAT3 is important for STAT3 homo-dimerization, which is essential for the DNA-binding and the transcriptional activation of oncogenes. The acetylation of STAT3 is catalyzed by histone acetyltransferase p300, and reversed by type 1 histone deacetylase. The lysine acetylation of STAT3 is also elevated in cancer cells.

==== Therapeutic implications for cancer therapy ====
Since the acetylation of STAT3 is important for its oncogenic activity and the fact that the level of acetylated STAT3 is high in cancer cells, it is implied that targeting acetylated STAT3 for chemoprevention and chemotherapy is a promising strategy. This strategy is supported by treating resveratrol, an inhibitor of acetylation of STAT3, in cancer cell line reverses aberrant CpG island methylation.

== See also ==
- Compendium of protein lysine acetylation
- Glycosylation
- Lipidation
- Proteolysis
