= NatB =

Enzyme

N-terminal acetyltransferase B
Overview
- Synonyms: NatB
- EC Number: 2.3.1.254
- Subunits: NAA20, NAA25
- Complex Portal: CPX-6270

NatB (short for N-terminal acetyltransferase B) is an enzyme and protein complex found in humans and other eukaryotes. It is part of the enzyme group called N-terminal acetyltransferases (NATs), which modify proteins by doing N-terminal acetylation. NatB is one of the major NATs in the cell and is a heterodimeric complex found in the cytosol consisting of the auxiliary subunit NAA25, and the catalytic subunit NAA20. Subunit NAA25 anchors to the ribosome, and subunit NAA20 is the enzymatic subunit. The NatB complex adds an acetyl group directly on a substrate protein as it is being made on the ribosome, also known as co-translational modification. Studying the NatB complex binding to the ribosome in yeast has shown that NatB is localized at the exit tunnel of the ribosome, and binding of the NatB subunits on the ribosome depends on ES27a (small ribosomal subunit protein). NatB is structurally and biologically the same between yeast (Saccharomyces cerevisiae) and humans.

The structure of the NatB complex in yeast (Candida albicans) was studied in 2017., and NAA25 seems to create a pocket for NAA20, where target protein is bound to. The NAA20 structure in the thermophilic fungus Chaetomium thermophilum was successfully characterized in 2020, and NAA20 was found to be able to acetylate target proteins in the absence of NAA25, though with a lower acetylation rate than the NAA20/NAA25 complex of NatB. However, NAA20 in humans is unstable in the absence of NAA25 and therefore NatB forms a complex in vivo

NatB is responsible for N-terminally acetylating approximately 20% of the human proteome. NatB acetylates N-terminal proteins starting with methionine (iMet) followed by

or amidic amino acids, making the target pool to be MD, ME, MN and MQ. Almost 100% of all the proteins that are target substrates of NatB are N-terminally acetylated, which is a unique feature of NatB compared to other NATs. Finding substrates and proteins that are N-terminally acetylated by NatB has been studied in yeast and humans in order to understand the biological function of NatB. In yeast, lack of N-terminal acetylation activity by NatB has an effect on actin and tropomyosin interactions. The NF-κB subunit p65 has also been proposed to be a target protein in humans, as well as tropomyosin 1. NatB also seems to potentially regulate the Set-COMPASS subunit protein Swd1 by N-terminal acetylation, and therefore NatB could regulate H3K4 methylation together with NatA. NatB might also regulate NAD^{+} metabolism in yeast, where knockout of nat3Δ (NAA25) and mdm20Δ (NAA20) decreased the levels of the nicotinamide mononucleotide adenylyltransferase (Nmnat) proteins Nma1 and Nma2.

NATs belongs to the GCN5 related N-acetyltransferases (GNAT) superfamily. N-terminal acetylation is the process of adding an acetyl group during or after protein synthesis.

== NatB phenotypes ==
Studying the effect of mutations in the NAA20 gene and the NAA25 gene in human cells have shown similar cellular phenotypes, among others that downregulating NatB activity reduce the cytoskeleton stability by affecting the actin microfilaments and focal adhesion. By knocking out either the NAA20 or NAA25 gene, the same was observed in human cells as in yeast cells; reduction of actin microfibrils, as well as reduction of focal adhesions in the cell. The findings in this study also indicated that human NatB is more likely to acetylate MQ- protein N-termini at a higher rate than yeast NatB. Meaning that NatB is important for maintaining the structure and movement of the cell.

NatB might also be linked to proteins involved in cellular growth, as knockdown of both NAA20 and NAA25 resulted in a decrease in cell proliferation. Knocking down either NAA20 or NAA25 however resulted in decrease in cell proliferation, more cell death or cells locked in the interphase stage (G_{0}/G_{1}), respectively.

NatB has also been studied in mouse embryonic fibroblasts (MEFs) cells by knocking out the NAA20 gene, and as in human and yeast, cell proliferation decreased, as well as actin cytoskeleton and disorganization of and decrease in focal adhesion. DNA replication was also negatively affected, probably causing senescence in the cells.

== Diseases ==
There are some indications that NatB might N-terminally acetylate α-synuclein, a protein involved in Parkinson's disease. α-synuclein is a potential match for NatB enzymatic activity, as the protein starts with MD. N-terminal acetylation of α-synuclein has been found to stabilize the protein and regulate the neuronal toxicity level. NatB is also found to be essential for shutoff activity of PA-X, a protein from Influenza A virus. PA-X influences the gene expression and the immune response in a host, and NatB contributes by shutting off the RNA replication of the virus, even though the mechanism behind this is not known.

There are some cancer related phenotypes where NAA20 expression was upregulated in hepatocarcinoma and liver cancer. NAA20 expression was also upregulated in by triple-negative breast cancer cells (TNBC), and studies showed that NAA20 could be targeted by TNBC cells to promote cell proliferation by activating EGFR signaling via Rab5A. Knockdown of NAA20 in vivo showed a decrease in tumor growth

There are recent studies involving patients having mutations in the NAA20 gene, which were discovered by genetic screening. These patient mutations were found to affect the enzymatic properties of NatB thus probably being the cause of the various symptoms affecting their lives. These mutations are rare, involving only seven individuals from three different families reported so far, but all various mutations that have been found are on the NAA20 gene. The first instance of a pathogenic NAA20 variant were two siblings with a Met54Val missense mutation and three siblings with a homozygous missense variant Ala80Val, and the second instance was about two siblings with a Gln34Ter/Leu4Pro biallelic mutation. The common effect of these mutations is that there is weaker binding of NAA20 to NAA25, thereby reducing the capacity of the NatB complex to add an acetyl group to a target protein.

There are some slight differences in the clinical symptoms in the seven patients, the main one is that the patients with either Met54Val or Ala80Val mutation had decreased head circumference, a condition known as microcephaly. The common symptoms in all seven patients are various forms of developmental delay in form of speech impairment, walking disabilities and changes in facial features. Which proteins are affected and could cause the pathogenic symptoms is to date not known and must be further studied, since the effect of NAA20 loss of function is quite impactful to the patients' health and quality of life.

== Treatment in the future ==
N-terminal acetylation plays a larger role overall in cell homeostasis and changing one of the NATs has a large impact, mostly due to the vast number of substrates that are subjected to N-terminal acetylation. The mechanism and impact on the proteome level are much needed to be studied, to understand the molecular mechanisms underlying the phenotypes of the affected individuals. There could be many proteins involved in such mechanisms, and this needs to be studied to reveal new angles for improved treatment.
