= NAA80 =

Protein-coding gene in humans

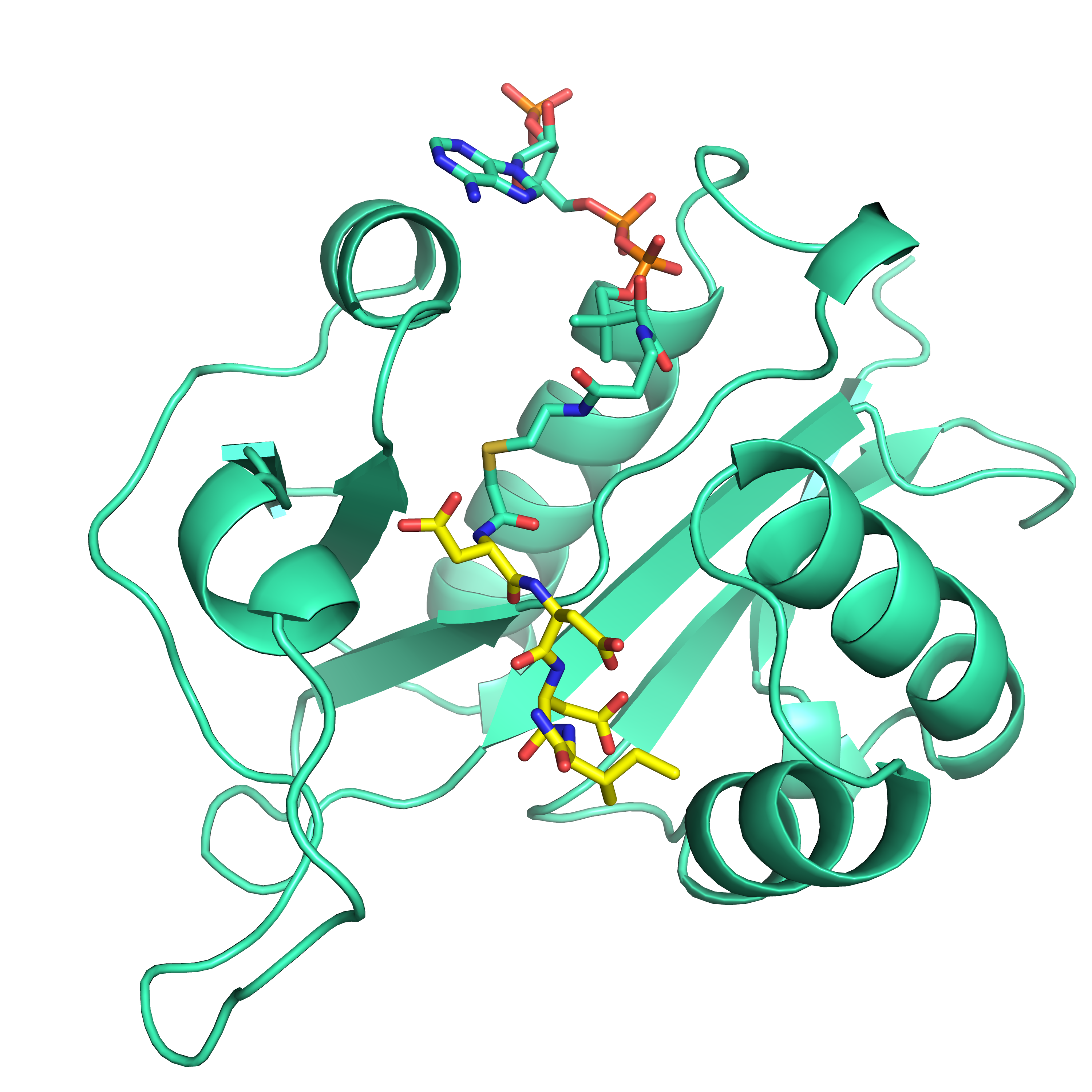
- Crystal structure of Drosophila melanogaster Naa80. Substrate peptide is shown as yellow sticks and CoA is shown as cyan sticks. Enzyme is displayed as cyan cartoon. (PDB ID: 5WJE)

Identifiers
- Aliases: NAA80, FUS-2, FUS2, N-acetyltransferase 6, NAT6, N(alpha)-acetyltransferase 80, NatH catalytic subunit, HsNAAA80, N-alpha-acetyltransferase 80, NatH catalytic subunit
- External IDs: OMIM: 607073; MGI: 1888902; GeneCards: NAA80

Gene location (Human)
Chr.	Chromosome 3 (human)
Band	3p21.31	Start	50,296,402 bp
Band	3p21.31	End	50,299,416 bp

Gene location (Mouse)
Chr.	Chromosome 9 (mouse)
Band	9 F1|9 58.18 cM	Start	107,456,086 bp
Band	9 F1|9 58.18 cM	End	107,461,249 bp
RNA expression pattern
Bgee	Human / Mouse (ortholog); Top expressed in: left testis; right testis; apex of heart; right hemisphere of cerebellum; granulocyte; right frontal lobe; skin of abdomen; body of stomach; right lung; prefrontal cortex / Top expressed in: left lobe of liver; seminiferous tubule; lacrimal gland; lip; muscle of thigh; right kidney; spermatid; choroid plexus of fourth ventricle; brown adipose tissue; proximal tubule; More reference expression data
BioGPS	n/a
Gene ontology
Molecular function	transferase activity; acyltransferase activity; N-acetyltransferase activity; acetyl-CoA binding; peptide alpha-N-acetyltransferase activity
Cellular component	cytoplasm; cytosol
Biological process	protein acetylation; regulation of actin polymerization or depolymerization; N-terminal peptidyl-aspartic acid acetylation; N-terminal peptidyl-glutamic acid acetylation; actin modification
Sources:Amigo / QuickGO
Orthologs
Databases	NCBI: entry; OMA: entry
Species	Human	Mouse
Entrez	24142	56441
Ensembl	ENSG00000243477	ENSMUSG00000079334
UniProt	Q93015; Q6IAP1	Q9R123
RefSeq (mRNA)	NM_012191; NM_001200016; NM_001200018	NM_019750
RefSeq (protein)	NP_001186945; NP_001186947; NP_036323; NP_001186945.1; NP_001186947.1 NP_036323.2	NP_062724
Location (UCSC)	Chr 3: 50.3 – 50.3 Mb	Chr 9: 107.46 – 107.46 Mb
PubMed search
- Wikidata
View/Edit Human	View/Edit Mouse

N-acetyltransferase 80 (also known as NAT6 or FUS2) is a protein that in humans is encoded by the NAA80 gene. It acetylates the N-terminus of mature actin.

== Function ==
This gene encodes a member of the N-acetyltransferase family. N-acetyltransferases modify proteins by transferring acetyl groups from acetyl-CoA to the N-termini of protein substrates. The encoded protein is a cytoplasmic N-acetyltransferase with a substrate specificity for N-termini that are enriched for acidic residues. This gene is located in the tumor suppressor gene region on chromosome 3p21.3, and the encoded protein may play a role in cancer. Alternatively spliced transcript variants encoding multiple isoforms have been observed. This gene overlaps and is on the same strand as hyaluronoglucosaminidase 3, and some transcripts of each gene share a portion of the first exon. [provided by RefSeq, Jan 2011].

Naa80 acetylates the N-terminus of mature actin. This N-terminal acetylation affects the rates of actin filament depolymerization and elongation, and the overall morphology of the cell.

== Structure ==
Naa80 is a member of the GNAT family of acetyltransferases. It has an overall fold similar to the other N-terminal acetyltransferases, but has a more open, basic active site to accommodate the acidic N-terminus of actin. Naa80 can acetylate peptides with different N-terminal residues, but the presence of acidic residues in positions 2 and 3 is important for substrate specificity. Most Naa80 orthologs have an extended polyproline loop which may be important for actin binding through profilin.

== Clinical Significance ==
Naa80 is thought to be involved in the function of the inner ear, brain and muscle, as individuals of one single family with bi-allelic mutations in NAA80 show sensorineural hearing loss, developmental delay, muscle weakness and craniofacial dysmorphisms.
