= Compendium of protein lysine acetylation =

CPLA

Content
- Description: protein lysine acetylation.

Contact
- Research center: University of Science and Technology of China
- Primary citation: PMID 21059677

Access
- Website: http://cpla.biocuckoo.org

The compendium of protein lysine acetylation (CPLA) database contains the sites of experimentally identified lysine acetylation sites.
