= N-terminal acetylation =

N-terminal acetylation, protein modification

N-terminal acetylation is the protein modification that occurs on the α-amino acid group at the N-termini of proteins. The backbone amino group on the first amino acid (α-amino group) on a protein N-terminus gets an acetyl group (-COCH_{3}) via acetyl-CoA, and this process is catalyzed by enzymes called N-terminal acetyltransferases (NATs). This changes the chemical properties by making the protein more hydrophobic. Adding an acetyl group on the N-terminus of proteins is to date not shown to be reversible.

== Background ==
Acetylation of a protein is adding an acetyl group on one or several amino acids in the protein. This protein modification can happen internally on an ε- amino acid group of a protein. An internal acetylation is called lysine acetylation, as it is an internal lysine (K) that is added an acetyl group (-COCH_{3}). This process is catalyzed by enzymes named lysine acetyltransferases (KATs) by using acetyl-CoA as donor. This process can be reversed, meaning that the acetyl group can be removed by lysine deacetylases (KDACs).

== N-terminal acetyltransferases ==
There are seven human N-terminal acetyltransferases discovered to date, named NatA, NatB, NatC, NatD, NatE, NatF, and NatH. There is a group of plant NATs discovered called NatG.

NatA, NatB, NatC, NatD and NatE work co-translationally by binding to the ribosome. NatD/NAA40 is in itself ribosome-binding, whereas the remaining four of these NATs bind to the ribosome via an auxiliary subunit. NatF and NatH modify proteins post-translationally and are as far as we know monomeric enzymes. NatA targets about 38% of the human proteome, NatB almost 21%, whereas NatC, NatE and NatF together target in total 21% of the human proteome. That means that the different NATs in total acetylate over 80% of the human proteome, making N-terminal acetylation a highly abundant protein modification.

NatA was the first NAT to be described, and its structure consists of the catalytic subunit NAA10 and the auxiliary subunit NAA15 which together is called the NatA complex. The NatA complex also binds to HYPK (Huntingtin-interacting protein K) which can stabilize the NatA complex. NatA targets proteins starting with S, A, T, G, V and C, and has the largest substrate pool of all the NATs. However, NAA10 can also work independently of NAA15, and acetylate proteins on its own. NatB consists of the catalytic subunit NAA20 and the auxiliary subunit NAA25. The target proteins of NatB are those that have N-termini starting with the amino acids MD, ME, MN and MQ. NatC consists of the catalytic subunit NAA30, and NAA35 which anchors the ribosome and NAA38 whose role is still not known. The targets of NatC are MI-, ML-, MF-, MY- and MK-starting protein N-termini.

NatD consists of one catalytic unit called NAA40 with high substrate selectivity, targeting only histones H2A and H4 and some proteins starting with SGRGK. NatE consists of the unit NAA50 which binds to the NatA complex and HYPK, and this NatE complex targets MS-, MT-, MA-, MV-, ML-, MI-, MF-, MY- and MK-starting N-termini. NatF consists of the catalytic NAA60 and is localized to the cytosolic side of the Golgi membrane, and it is the only known NAT that is specifically targeting membrane proteins. The targets of NatF are MI-, ML-, MF-, MY- and MK-starting membrane proteins. NatH consist of the catalytic NAA80. It is highly specific and targets only actins, including cytoplasmic β-actin and γ-actin. NatH works post-translationally in the cytosol on actin at the final maturation stage of actin and it interacts with profilin which promotes actin N-terminal acetylation

NatG is a group of plant NATs that was discovered in 2015. NatG consists of several plant-specific GNAT proteins with dual functions as KATs and NATs targets chloroplast proteins with N-termini starting with A, M, T, S.

== Impact on proteins in human cells and for pathologies ==
Most proteins in the human body have this protein modification, and there are several cellular and biological functions of N-terminal acetylation. As a general overview, the N-terminal acetylation functions like a label, and the target could be to relocate a protein to a different subcellular location, activate a protein for its proper function. An example is that N-terminally acetylated actin is part of keeping a normal functional cytoskeleton. A modified protein could target the protein for degradation, and for some proteins it can do the opposite and protect it from degradation. An important role of NatC is to protect proteins from degradation otherwise mediated by ubiquitin ligases. In human and plant cells, NatA can also protect proteins from degradation by ubiquitin ligases and thereby stabilize these. There are also reports of N-terminal acetylation could have a stabilizing effect depending on the protein in question.

Lack of N-terminal acetylation has been associated with different pathologies in recent years. Pathogenic variants in the coding DNA region of the NATs may result in a NAT with reduced enzymatic activity. There have been found several patient mutations like this where NatA has been affected. The first case of NatA defect in 2011 had severe consequences, involving developmental delay, heart failures, aged appearance and a short life span. Pathogenic variants have also been found in the coding region of NAA20, where the patients have developed various symptoms like speech delay, epilepsy and cognitive impairment due to weakening of the NatB complex formation. Other diseases linked to lack of N-terminal acetylation involve NatF, where lack of NAA60 activity had shown to cause primary familial brain calcifications. N-terminal acetyltransferases have also been linked to cancer progression, including NAA10, NAA20, NAA30, NAA40 and NAA50. Due to the large number of proteins having these modifications, often malfunction in the N-terminal acetyltransferases the human body have so called pleiotropic effects. As there are several diseases linked to lack of N-terminal acetylation, it is important to investigate genetic variants that lead to disease, but also to do research on the basal functions of NATs to reveal new therapeutic angles for these diseases.
