= N-alpha-acetyltransferase 20 =

Enzyme found in humans

NAA20

Identifiers
- Aliases: NAA20, NAT3, NAT3P, NAT5, NAT5P, dJ1002M8.1, N(alpha)-acetyltransferase 20, NatB catalytic subunit, N-alpha-acetyltransferase 20, NatB catalytic subunit, MRT73
- External IDs: OMIM: 610833; MGI: 1915127; GeneCards: NAA20
Enzyme activity
| EC # | BRENDA | ExPASy | KEGG | MetaCyc |
|---|---|---|---|---|
| 2.3.1.254 | ↗ | ↗ | ↗ | ↗ |

Gene location (Human)
| Chr. | Chromosome 20 (human) |
| Band | 20p11.23 | Start | 20,017,310 bp |
| Band | 20p11.23 | End | 20,033,655 bp |

Gene location (Mouse)
| Chr. | Chromosome 2 (mouse) |
| Band | 2 G1|2 71.28 cM | Start | 145,744,019 bp |
| Band | 2 G1|2 71.28 cM | End | 145,758,345 bp |
RNA expression pattern
| Bgee | Human / Mouse (ortholog); Top expressed in: islet of Langerhans; tibialis anterior muscle; mucosa of pharynx; gingival epithelium; oral cavity; skin of arm; body of pancreas; right testis; deltoid muscle; left testis / Top expressed in: heart; quadriceps femoris muscle; epiblast; embryo; neural tube; right kidney; mesencephalon; ventricular zone; lip; thymus; More reference expression data |
| BioGPS | n/a |
Gene ontology
| Molecular function | transferase activity; acyltransferase activity; peptide alpha-N-acetyltransferase activity |
| Cellular component | intracellular anatomical structure; NatB complex; cytosol; nucleus; cytoplasm |
| Biological process | N-terminal peptidyl-methionine acetylation |
Sources:Amigo / QuickGO
Orthologs
| Databases | NCBI: entry; OMA: entry |
| Species | Human | Mouse |
| Entrez | 51126 | 67877 |
| Ensembl | ENSG00000173418 | ENSMUSG00000002728 |
| UniProt | P61599 | P61600 |
| RefSeq (mRNA) | NM_181528; NM_016100; NM_181527 | NM_001141965; NM_026425 |
| RefSeq (protein) | NP_057184; NP_852668; NP_852669 | NP_001135437; NP_080701 |
| Location (UCSC) | Chr 20: 20.02 – 20.03 Mb | Chr 2: 145.74 – 145.76 Mb |
| PubMed search |
- Wikidata
| View/Edit Human | View/Edit Mouse |

N-alpha-acetyltransferase 20 is an enzyme that in humans is encoded by the NAA20 gene (previously NAT5). The NAA20 protein binds to NAA25 to form the NatB complex (N-acetyltransferase complex B) which acetylates certain methionine residues. It is the catalytic subunit.
