= Peptide alpha-N-acetyltransferase =

Class of enzyme

peptide alpha-N-acetyltransferase

Identifiers
- EC no.: 2.3.1.88
- CAS no.: 83452-29-3

Databases
- IntEnz: IntEnz view
- BRENDA: BRENDA entry
- ExPASy: NiceZyme view
- KEGG: KEGG entry
- MetaCyc: metabolic pathway
- PRIAM: profile
- PDB structures: RCSB PDB PDBe PDBsum
- Gene Ontology: AmiGO / QuickGO
Search
- PMC: articles
- PubMed: articles
- NCBI: proteins

In enzymology, peptide α-N-acetyltransferase (EC 2.3.1.88) were enzymes that catalyzes the chemical reaction

acetyl-CoA + peptide $\rightleftharpoons$ Nα-acetylpeptide + CoA

Thus, the two substrates of this enzyme are acetyl-CoA and peptide, whereas its two products are Nα-acetylpeptide and CoA. Since 2016, the different enzymes that used to be in this class are separated into NatA-NatF (EC 2.3.1.254 to EC 2.3.1.259).

These enzymes belong to the family of transferases, specifically those acyltransferases transferring groups other than aminoacyl groups. The systematic name of this enzyme class is acetyl-CoA:peptide Nα-acetyltransferase. Other names in common use include beta-endorphin acetyltransferase, peptide acetyltransferase, protein N-terminal acetyltransferase, NAT, Nalpha-acetyltransferase, amino-terminal amino acid-acetylating enzyme, and acetyl-CoA:peptide alpha-N-acetyltransferase.

== Structural studies ==
As of late 2007, two structures have been solved for this class of enzymes, with PDB accession codes PDB: 2OB0 and PDB: 2PSW.
