= Acetylation =

Chemical reaction that attaches an acetyl group to a compound

Salicylic acid is acetylated with acetic anhydride to form aspirin and acetic acid as a byproduct

In chemistry, acetylation is an organic esterification reaction with acetic acid. It introduces an acetyl group into a chemical compound. Such compounds are termed acetate esters or simply acetates. Deacetylation is the opposite reaction, the removal of an acetyl group from a chemical compound.

== Acetylation/deacetylation in biology ==
Histone deacetylases "play crucial roles in gene transcription and most likely in all eukaryotic biological processes that involve chromatin".

Acetylation is one type of post-translational modification of proteins. The acetylation of the ε-amino group of lysine, which is common, converts a charged side chain to a neutral one. Acetylation/deacetylation of histones also plays a role in gene expression and cancer. These modifications are effected by enzymes called histone acetyltransferases (HATs) and histone deacetylases (HDACs).

Two general mechanisms are known for deacetylation. One mechanism involves zinc binding to the acetyl oxygen. Another family of deacetylases require NAD^{+}, which transfers an ribosyl group to the acetyl oxygen.

== Organic synthesis ==
Acetate esters and acetamides are generally prepared by acetylations. Acetylations are often used in making C-acetyl bonds in Friedel-Crafts reactions. Carbanions and their equivalents are susceptible to acetylations.

=== Acetylation reagents ===
Many acetylations are achieved using these three reagents:

- Acetic anhydride: This reagent is common in the laboratory; its use cogenerates acetic acid.
- Acetyl chloride: This reagent is also common in the laboratory, but its use cogenerates hydrogen chloride, which can be undesirable.
- Ketene: At one time acetic anhydride was prepared by the reaction of ketene with acetic acid:

H_{2}C=C=O + CH_{3}CO_{2}H → (CH_{3}CO)_{2}O $\Delta H = -63 \text{ kJ/mol}$

=== Acetylation of cellulose ===
Cellulose is a polyol and thus susceptible to acetylation, which is achieved using acetic anhydride. Acetylation disrupts hydrogen bonding, which otherwise dominates the properties of cellulose. Consequently, the cellulose esters are soluble in organic solvents and can be cast into fibers and films.

=== Acetylation of wood ===
Acetylation of wood is a chemical modification process that enhances the properties of wood by making it highly resistant to fungi and insects, as well as very durable against moisture and environmental parameters.

The process involves the chemical reaction of acetic anhydride with the free hydroxyl groups in wood polymers, mostly of lignin and hemicelluloses, without requiring a catalyst. The modification results in bonds between the structural polymeric components, significantly reducing the ability of the -OH groups to form hydrogen bonds with water molecules. This effectively "locks" the cellular walls, minimizing the capacity of wood to absorb water and enhancing its dimensional stability. Approximately 80-90% of the hydroxyl groups of wood are modified during the process. The whole process is an environmentally friendly treatment, and has emerged, in the 21st century, as a significant innovation in the scientific area of wood science.

=== Transacetylation ===
Transacetylation uses vinyl acetate as an acetyl donor and lipase as a catalyst. This methodology allows the preparation of enantio-enriched alcohols and acetates.

== See also ==
- Acetoxy group
- Acylation
- Amide
- Ester
- N-terminal acetylation
- Organic synthesis
